= Marie Louise =

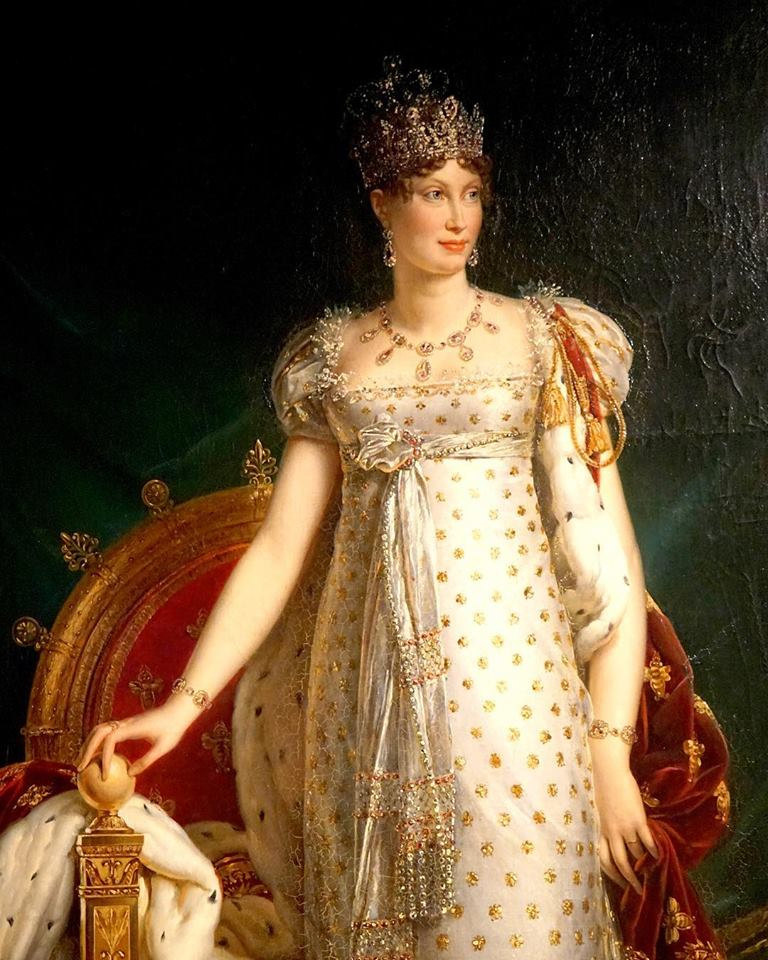
Marie Louise, Duchess of Parma, second wife of Napoleon, wearing the Marie Louise Diadem

Marie Louise or Marie-Louise is a French feminine compound given name. In other languages, it may take one of several alternate forms:

- Maria Luiza (Bulgarian, Portuguese)
- Maria Luisa (Italian, Spanish)
- Maria Luise, Marie Luise (German)
- Maria Louisa, Mary Louise or Mary Lou (English).

Notable people with the name include:

== Literature ==
- Marie Louise Andrews (1849–1891), American short story writer, journalist and editor
- Marie-Louise Belarbi (1928–2020), French-Moroccan bookseller, publisher and writer
- Marie-Louise Boudât (1916–1968), French letterist and author
- Marie-Louise Bousquet (1885–1975), French fashion journalist and Harper's Bazaar editor
- Marie Louise Burgess-Ware (1870–?), African-American writer
- Marie-Louise Colomb (1892–1965), Swiss writer
- Marie-Louise Dreier (born 1936), Belgian poet
- Marie-Louise Fitzpatrick (born 1962), Irish children's author and illustrator
- Marie-Louise af Forsell (1823–1852), Swedish diarist
- Marie Louise von François (1817–1893), German writer
- Marie-Louise Gagneur (1832–1902), French feminist writer
- Marie-Louise Gay (born 1952), Canadian children's writer and illustrator
- Marie-Louise Haumont (1919–2012), Belgian writer
- Marie-Louise Jensen (born 1964), English children's author
- Marie Louise Lévêque de Vilmorin (1902–1969), French novelist and poet
- Marie Louise Hamilton Mack (1870–1935), Australian poet
- Marie-Louise Marmette (1870–1928), French-Canadian journalist, writer and speaker
- Marie Louise Mignot (1712–1790), niece, housekeeper, hostess and love interest of Voltaire
- Marie-Louise Mumbu (born 1975), Congolese journalist
- Marie Louise de la Ramee (1839–1908), pseudonym Ouida, English novelist
- Marie Louise Shedlock (1854–1935), French storyteller
- Marie Louise Victoire, La Rochejacquelein (1772–1857), French memoirist

== Music ==
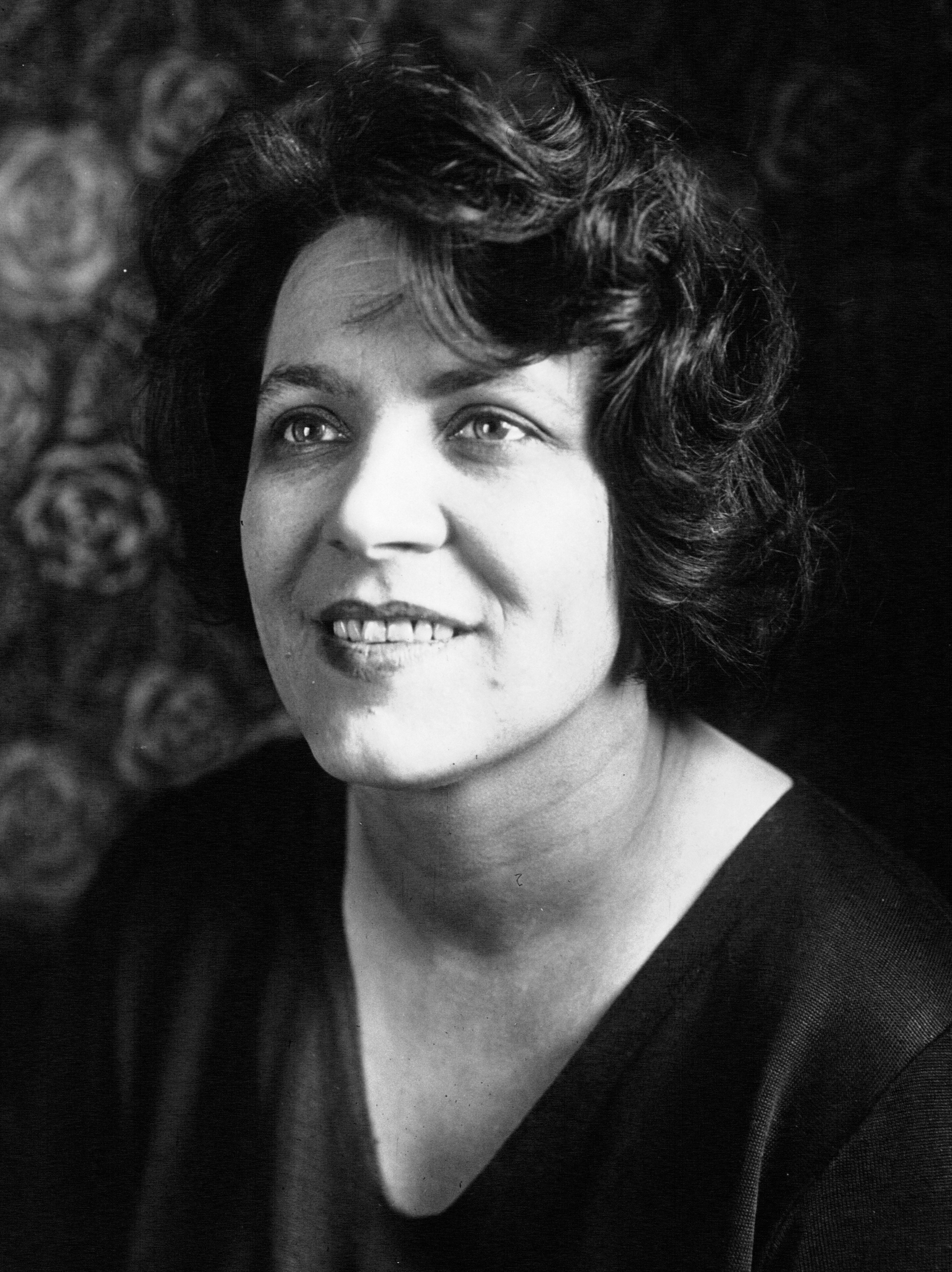
Marie-Louise Damien, better known as "Damia", had a forty-year career as a French actress in the early 20th century

- Marie-Louise-Taos Amrouche (1913–1976), Algerian singer and writer
- Marie-Louise Cantotti (1910–1999), American opera singer
- Marie-Louise Cébron-Norbens (1888–1958), French opera singer
- Marie-Louise Dähler, Swiss harpsichordist
- Marie-Louise Damien (1889–1978), French singer and actress
- Marie-Louise Desmatins (died 1708), French opera singer
- Marie-Louise Gilles (born 1937), French opera singer
- Marie-Louise Girod (1915–2014), French organist and composer
- Marie-Louise Emma Cécile Lajeunesse (1847–1930), Canadian-British opera singer
- Marie Louise Marcadet (1758–1804), Swedish opera singer and stage actress

== Nobility ==
Sorted chronologically

- Marie Louise Gonzaga (1611–1667), Queen of Poland and Grand Duchess of Lithuania
- Marie Louise d'Aspremont (1651/1652–1692), daughter of Charles II, Count d’Aspremont; wife of Charles IV, Duke of Lorraine
- Marie Louise d'Orléans (1662–1689), eldest daughter of Philippe de France and Princess Henrietta Anne of England; later Queen of Spain as wife of Charles II
- Marie Louise of Hesse-Kassel (1688–1765), daughter of Charles I, Landgrave of Hesse-Kassel; wife of John William Friso, Prince of Orange
- Marie Louise Élisabeth d'Orléans (1695–1719), daughter of Philippe II, Duke of Orléans, wife of Charles, Duke of Berry
- Marie Louise Adélaïde d'Orléans (1698–1743), daughter of Philippe II, Duke of Orléans
- Marie Louise de Rohan (1720–1803), daughter of Jules de Rohan, Prince of Soubise; wife of Gaston, Count of Marsan
- Marie Louise de La Tour d'Auvergne (1725–1793), daughter of Charles Godefroy de La Tour d'Auvergne; wife of Jules, Prince of Guéméné
- Marie Louise Élisabeth of France (1727–1759), daughter of King Louis XV of France; wife of Philip, Duke of Parma
- Marie Louise of France (1728–1733), daughter of Louis XV of France
- Countess Maria Louise Albertine of Leiningen-Dagsburg-Falkenburg (1729–1818), daughter of Count Christian Karl Reinhard of Leiningen-Dagsburg-Falkenburg; wife of Prince George William of Hesse-Darmstadt
- Marie Thérèse Louise of Savoy, Princesse de Lamballe (1749–1792), daughter of Louis Victor, Prince of Carignano; wife of Louis Alexandre, Prince de Lamballe
- Marie-Louise Coidavid (1778–1851), Queen of Haiti
- Marie Louise, Duchess of Parma (1791–1847), second wife of Napoléon Bonaparte and Empress of the French
- Duchess Marie Louise of Mecklenburg-Schwerin (1803–1862), daughter of Frederick Louis of Mecklenburg-Schwerin; wife of Georg, Duke of Saxe-Altenburg
- Princess Marie Luise Charlotte of Hesse-Kassel (1814–1895), daughter of Prince William of Hesse-Kassel; wife of Prince Frederick Augustus of Anhalt-Dessau
- Countess Marie Louise Larisch von Moennich (1858–1940), illegitimate daughter of Ludwig Wilhelm, Duke in Bavaria
- Princess Marie Louise of Bourbon-Parma (1870–1899), daughter of Robert I, Duke of Parma; Princess Consort of Ferdinand I of Bulgaria
- Princess Marie Louise of Schleswig-Holstein (1872–1956), daughter of Prince Christian of Schleswig-Holstein and Princess Helena of the United Kingdom; wife of Prince Aribert of Anhalt
- Princess Marie Louise of Hanover (1879–1948), daughter of Ernest Augustus, Crown Prince of Hanover; wife of Prince Maximilian of Baden
- Princess Marie Louise of Orléans (1896–1973), daughter of Prince Emmanuel, Duke of Vendôme and Princess Henriette of Belgium
- Princess Marie Louise of Schaumburg-Lippe (1897–1938), Prussian princess
- Princess Marie-Louise of Madagascar (1897–1948), last heir apparent and pretender to the throne of the Kingdom of Madagascar
- Princess Marie Louise of Bulgaria (born 1933), daughter of Boris III of Bulgaria, wife of Prince Karl of Leiningen

== Politics and law ==
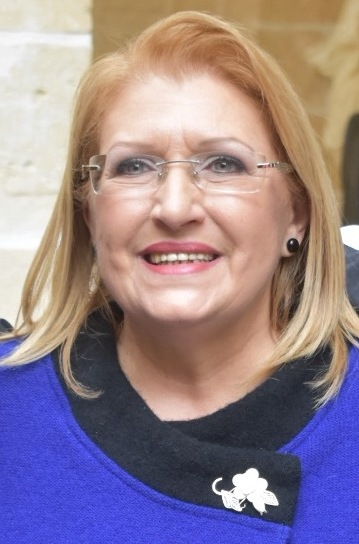
Marie-Louise Coleiro Preca was President of Malta from 2014 to 2019.

- Marie Louise Berneri (1918–1949), Italian anarchist activist and author
- Marie Louise Bottineau Baldwin (1863-1952), Native American rights activist and lawyer
- Marie-Louise Coleiro Preca (born 1958), former President of Malta
- Marie-Louise Correa (born 1943), Senegalese politician and doctor
- Marie-Louise Fort (1950–2022), French politician
- Marie-Louise Kehoe (born 1928), American politician
- Marie-Louise Loubet (1843–1925), wife of President of France Émile Loubet
- Marie-Louise Mwange (born 1961), Congolese politician
- Marie Louise Nignan-Bassolet, Burkinabe politician, first woman Minister of Justice (1982–1983)
- Marie Louise Obenauer (1870–1947), American pioneer in labor laws
- Marie-Louise O'Donnell (born 1952), Irish academic, broadcaster and politician
- Marie-Louise Puech-Milhau (1876–1966), French pacifist, feminist and journal editor
- Marie-Louise Potter (born 1959), Seychellois politician and diplomat
- Marie-Louise Rochebillard (1860–1936), French trade unionist
- Marie-Louise Hänel Sandström (born 1968), Swedish politician
- Marie-Louise Sibazuri (born 1960), Burundian activist
- Marie-Louise Tardif, Canadian politician elected in 2018
- Marie Louise Yovanovitch (born 1958), American diplomat

== Religion ==
- Marie Louise Burke (1912–2004), American Hindu religious writer
- Marie Louise Clinton (1871–1934), American church leader
- Marie Louise De Meester (1857–1928), French missionary
- Marie Louise Habets (1905–1986), Belgian nurse and religious sister
- Marie Louise Trichet (1684–1759), French Catholic saint and nun
- Marie-Louise Valade (1808–1861), Canadian Catholic nun
- Marie-Louise Martin (1860-1940), one of the daughters of Louis Martin and Marie-Azélie Guérin who became a Carmelite nun

== Science, engineering and mathematics ==
- Marie-Louise Bauchot (born 1928), French ichthyologist
- Marie Louise Marguerite Belèze (1851–1913), French botanist, explorer and taxonomist
- Marie Louise Compernolle (1909–2005), first Flemish woman chemical engineer
- Marie-Louise Dubreil-Jacotin (1905–1972), French mathematician
- Marie-Louise von Franz (1915–1998), Swiss psychologist
- Marie Louise Killick (1914–1964), English audio engineer
- Marie Louise Lindberg (1918–2005), mineralogist
- Marie-Louise Michelsohn (born 1941), American mathematician
- Marie-Louise Nosch (born 1970), French archaeologist
- Marie-Louise Paris (1889–1969), French engineer, founder of the Institut électro-mécanique féminin (Women's Electro-mechanical Institute)
- Marie-Louise Saboungi (born 1948), American physicist
- Marie Louise Stig Sørensen (born 1954), Danish archaeologist
- Marie-Louise Sjoestedt (1900–1940), French linguist and literary scholar
- Marie-Louise Tenèze, French ethnologist and folklorist
- Marie Louise Uhr (1923–2001), Australian biochemist and Catholic feminist

== Sports ==
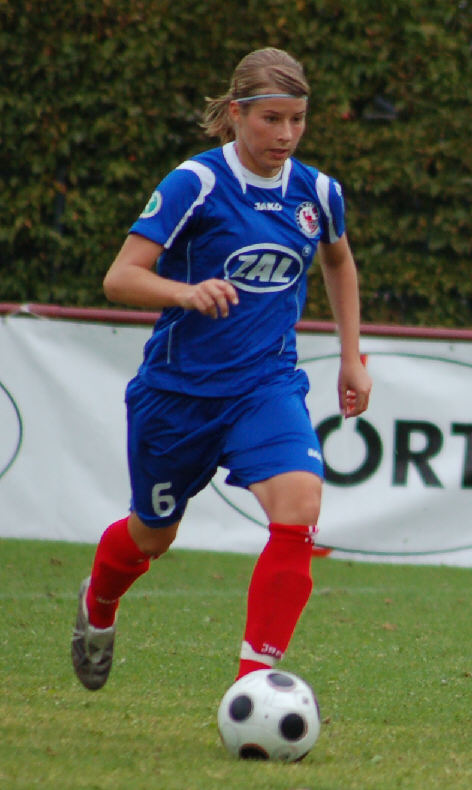
Marie-Louise Eta, a German footballer, playing for Turbine Potsdam in 2009

- Marie-Louise Bévis (born 1972), French sprinter
- Marie-Louise Butzig (1944–2017), French football goalkeeper
- Marie-Louise Castenskiold (born 1960), Danish equestrian
- Marie-Louise Dräger (born 1981), German Olympic rower
- Marie-Louise Eta (born 1991), German football player and manager
- Marie-Louise Hamrin (born 1957), Swedish long-distance runner
- Marie-Louise Horn (1912–1991), German tennis player
- Marie-Louise Hosdey (born 1945), Belgian sports shooter
- Marie Louise Kirkland (1899–1999), American Catholic nun and sports commentator
- Marie-Louise Ledru, French long-distance runner
- Marie-Louise Linssen-Vaessen (1928–1993), Dutch freestyle swimmer
- Marie-Louise Perrenoud (born 1947), French speed skater
- Marie-Louise Pierre (born 1955), Haitian sprinter
- Marie Louise Reilly (born 1980), Irish rugby union player
- Marie Sirois (1865–1920), erroneously known as Marie Louise Sirois, French-Canadian strongwoman
- Marie Louise Steffensen (born 1996), Danish badminton player

== Visual arts ==
- Marie Louise Amiet (1879–1944), French painter and illustrator
- Marie-Louise Arsenault (born 1968), Canadian film director and radio host
- Marie Louise Asseu (1966–2016), Ivorian actress, director and film producer
- Marie Louise Anna Beaudet (1859–1947), Canadian actress and dancer
- Maria Luise Katharina Breslau (1856–1927), Swiss painter
- Marie Louise Brimberg (born 1948), Danish photographer
- Marie-Louise Bruyère (1884–1959?), French fashion designer
- Marie-Louise Carven (1909–2015), French fashion designer
- Marie-Louise Ekman (born 1944), Swedish painter and film director
- Marie Louise Fuller (1862–1928), American actress and dancer
- Marie-Louise Hairs (1912–1998), Belgian art historian
- Marie Louise Kold (born 1974), Danish artist
- Marie-Louise Laleyan (1935–2014), American architect
- Marie-Louise von Motesiczky (1906–1996), Austrian-born British painter
- Marie-Louise Jeanne Nicolle Mourer (1920–1967), French film actress
- Marie-Louise Pichot (1885–1947), French painter
- Marie Louise Thomsen (1823–1907), Danish photographer

== Other ==
- Marie-Louise Arconati-Visconti (1840–1923), French philanthropist, salonnière and art collector
- Marie-Louise Ayres (born 1963), Australian librarian
- Marie-Louise de Beauvoir (1776–1855), Belgian educator
- Marie-Louise Bertschinger (1910/1911–1970), Swiss humanitarian
- Marie-Louise Bouglé (1883-1936), French feminist, librarian, and archivist
- Marie-Louise Charles (1765–after 1807), French businesswoman and former slave
- Marie-Louise Charpentier (1905-1998), French Resistance member
- Marie-Louise Cloarec (1917–1945), French World War member of the Special Operations Executive
- Marie-Louise Dissard (1881–1957), French Resistance member
- Marie-Louise Driancourt (1887–1914), French pilot
- Marie Louise Garibaldi (1934–2016), American judge
- Marie-Louise Giraud (1903–1943), French abortionist
- Marie-Louise Grenier (1845–1925), French circus lion tamer who took the name Nouma-Hawa
- Marie-Louise Jaÿ (1838–1925), French businesswoman
- Marie-Louise Lachapelle (1769–1821), French midwife
- Marie-Louise Lacoste (1849–1919), Canadian philanthropist
- Marie Louise Lefort (1874–1951), American physician
- Marie-Louise Marchand-Thébault (1921–2007), French historian and archivist
- Marie Louise Madeleine Victoire d'Argenton (1684-1749), royal mistress of Philippe II, Duke of Orléans
- Marie-Louise Meilland (1920–1987), French rose breeder and business owner
- Marie-Louise Meilleur (1880–1998), the oldest validated Canadian supercentenarian
- Marie Louise Scudder Myrick (1854–1934), American newspaper owner, manager and editor
- Marie-Louise O'Murphy (1737–1814), mistress of King Louis XV of France
- Marie-Louise Theile (born 1966), Australian news presenter
- Marie Louise Angélique Aimée Caroillon des Tillières (1797–1853), French heiress
- Marie-Louise Tromel (1717–1755), French Breton bandit
- Marie-Louise Victoire Girardin (1754–1794), French sailor disguised as a man who joined an expedition of discovery to Australia and the South Pacific

== See also ==
- Anne Marie Louise (disambiguation)
- Louise-Marie
- Joseph-Guillaume Barthe (1816–1893), Canadian writer who used the pseudonym 'Marie Louise'
