= Mary Louisa =

People with the name Mary Louisa include:

- Mary Louisa Armitt (1851–1911) British polymath
- Mary Louisa Bruce, Countess of Elgin (1819–1898)
- Mary Louisa Chitwood (1832–1855), American poet
- Mary Louisa Gordon (1861−1941) British prison inspector
- Mary Louisa Molesworth (1839–1921), English writer of children's stories
- Mary Louisa Page (1849–1921), American architect
- Mary Louisa Georgina Petrie (1861–1935), British author
- Mary Louisa Skinner (1876–1955), Australian Quaker, nurse, and writer, wrote a memoir of World War I experiences
- Mary Louisa Toynbee (born 1946), British journalist
- Mary Louisa Whately (1824–1889), English missionary in Egypt, known for building schools
- Mary Louisa White (1866–1935), British composer
- Mary Louisa Willard (1898–1993), forensic scientist

== See also ==
- Mary Louise (name)
- Mary Louise (disambiguation)
- Marie Louise (disambiguation)
- Maria Louisa
- Mary Lou (name)
- Marylou (disambiguation)
- Mary (given name)
- Louisa (disambiguation)
