= Marilu =

Marilu or Marilú is a feminine given name or nickname which may refer to:

- Marilú (doll), Argentine fashion doll produced between 1932 and 1960.
- Marilú (singer) (1927–2023), Mexican singer and actress

== Other uses ==
- Marilu Bueno (1940–2022), Brazilian actress
- Marilú Elízaga (1923–1995), stage name of Spanish actress María Luisa Pérez-Caballero Moltó
- Marilu Henner (born 1952), American actress, producer, radio host, and author
- Marilu Madrunio, Filipino forensic linguist
- Marilú Marini (born 1945), Argentine actress
- Marilu Padua, Mexican human rights activist
- Marilù Parolini (1931–2012) Italian photographer and screenwriter
- Marilú Rojas Salazar, Mexican researcher and Catholic theologian
- Marilù Tolo (born 1944), Italian film actress

== See also ==
- Mary Lou (name)
- Mary Louise (name)
- Marilou (singer)
