= Louise Smith (disambiguation) =

Louise Smith was an American NASCAR driver.

Louise Smith may also refer to:

- Louise Smith (theatre artist), American actress and playwright
- Louise Smith (state trooper), First black woman to serve in an American state police force
- Louise Jordan Smith (1868–1928), American painter and academic
- Louise Pettibone Smith (1887–1981), American biblical scholar, author and social activist
- Louise Setara (born 1988), née Smith, English singer-songwriter
- Louise Clappe (1819–1906), née Smith, writer
- Louise Hanson-Dyer (1884–1962), née Smith, Australian music publisher
- Louise Aloys Smith (1917–1999), American politician from Nevada

== See also ==
- Louise Smit (born 1940), South African writer
- Mary Louise Smith (disambiguation)
- Louise (given name)
- Smith (surname)
- Louise (disambiguation)
- Smith (disambiguation)
