= Maria Luisa =

Maria Luisa is a feminine compound given name which may refer to:

== Aristocracy ==
Ordered chronologicially

- Maria Luisa of Orléans (1662–1689), Queen consort of Spain
- Maria Luisa of Savoy (1688–1714), Queen consort of Spain
- Princess Maria Luisa of Savoy (1729–1767)
- Maria Luisa of Parma (1751–1819), Queen consort of Spain
- Maria Luisa, Duchess of Lucca (1782–1824), Queen of Etruria
- Maria Luisa, Duchess of Parma (1791–1847), known as Marie Louise, Empress consort of the French
- Archduchess Maria Luisa of Austria (1798–1857), also Princess of Bohemia
- Maria Luísa de Sousa Holstein, 3rd Duchess of Palmela (1841–1909), Portuguese sculptor and charity founder
- Princess Maria Luisa of the Two Sicilies (1855–1874)
- Infanta Maria Luisa, Duchess of Talavera (1880–1955)

== Others ==
Ordered alphabetically

- María Luisa Aguilar (1938–2015), Peruvian astronomer
- Maria Luisa Alanis Ruiz, American academic and activist
- María Luisa Albores (born 1976), Mexican politician
- María Luisa Alcalá (1943–2016), Mexican actress
- María Luisa Algarra (1916–1957), Spanish playwright
- Maria Luisa Ambrosini (20th century), non-fiction author
- María Luisa Anido (1907–1996), Argentine guitarist and composer
- María Luisa Aragón, Guatemalan playwright, actress and radio producer
- María Luisa Arcelay (1893–1981), Puerto Rican politician and businesswoman
- María Luisa Arencibia (born 1959), Venezuelan composer, organist and teacher
- María Luisa Artecona de Thompson (1919–2003), Paraguayan poet and playwright
- María Luisa Ávila Agüero (born 1961), Costa Rican politician
- María Luisa Bergaz Conesa (born 1947), Spanish politician
- Maria Luisa Berti (born 1971), Sammarinese politician
- Maria Luísa Betioli (born 1948), Brazilian high jumper
- María Luisa Bombal (1910–1980), Chilean novelist and poet
- María Luisa Bonet, Spanish computer scientist
- María Luisa Calle (born 1968), Colombian racing cyclist
- María Luisa Carnelli (1898–1987), Argentine writer, poet and educator
- María Luisa Carranque y Bonavía, Spanish artist
- Maria Luisa Cassanmagnago Cerretti (1929–2008), Italian politician
- María Luisa Caturla (1888–1984), Spanish art historian
- Maria Luisa Cicci (1760–1794), Italian woman of letters, poet and salon sponsor
- María Luisa Cordero (born 1943), Chilean TV presenter
- Maria Luísa Costa Dias (1916–1975), Portuguese communist and anti-government activist
- María Luisa Cuevas Rodríguez (born 1965), Spanish chess player
- Maria Luisa Dalla Chiara (born 1938), Italian logician and philosopher of science
- Maria Luisa De Crescenzo (born 1992), Italian actress
- María Luisa de la Riva y Callol-Muñoz (1865–1926), Spanish artist
- María Luisa Dehesa Gómez Farías (1912–2009), Mexican architect
- María Luisa Doig (born 1991), Peruvian fencer
- María Luisa Dolz (1854–1928), Cuban writer, essayist, educator and feminist activist
- María Luisa Elío (1926–2009), Spanish writer and actress
- Maria Luisa Escolar, pediatrician; clinical professor
- María Luisa Fernández (disambiguation)
- Maria Luisa Figueira, Portuguese psychiatrist and academic
- Maria Luisa Filangeri, Italian footballer
- María Luisa Flores (born 1979), Venezuelan actress and model
- Maria-Luisa Floro, Filipino gymnast
- María Luisa García (1919–2019), Spanish chef
- María Luisa Garza (1887–1980), Mexican writer
- María Luisa Gil (born 1977), Cuban model and actress
- María Luisa Godoy (born 1980), Chilean journalist and television presenter
- Maria Luisa Gorno-Tempini, Italian behavioral neurologist
- Maria Luisa Grohs, German footballer
- María Luisa Hayem (born 1972), Salvadoran economist and politician
- María Luisa Josefa (1866–1937), Mexican Roman Catholic nun
- María Luisa Landín (1921–2014), Mexican singer
- María Luisa Larraga (born 1970), Spanish long-distance runner
- María Luisa Manrique de Lara y Gonzaga (1649–1721), Mexican politician
- Maria Luísa Mendonça (born 1970), Brazilian actress
- María Luisa Mendoza (1930–2018), Mexican journalist, novelist and politician
- María Luisa Merlo (born 1941), Spanish actress
- Maria Luisa Monteiro da Cunha (1908–1980), Brazilian librarian
- María Luisa Montoto, Argentine politician
- María Luisa Morales (born 1954), Mexican gymnast
- María Luisa Muñoz (born 1959), Spanish long-distance runner
- María Luisa Ocampo Heredia (1899–1974), Mexican novelist, playwright and translator
- María Luisa Peña, Spanish sports shooter
- María Luisa Penne (1913–2005), Puerto Rican painter
- María Luisa Pérez Herrero (1898–1934), Spanish painter
- María Luisa Pérez-Soba (1930–2021), first female agricultural engineer in Galicia
- María Luisa Ponte (1918–1996), Spanish actress
- María Luisa Puga (1944–2004), Mexican writer
- María Luisa Reid (born 1943), Mexican artist
- María Luisa Robledo (1912–2005), Spanish actor
- María Luisa Ronquillo (born 1956), Mexican long-distance runner
- María Luisa Seco (1948–1988), Spanish television presenter
- María Luisa Sepúlveda (died 1958), Chilean composer and music educator
- María Luisa Servín (born 1962), Mexican long-distance runner
- María Luisa Souza (born 1941), Mexican swimmer
- Maria Luisa Spaziani (1923–2014), Italian poet
- María Luisa Vilca (1948–2019), Peruvian sprinter
- María Luisa Zea (1913–2002), Mexican actress and singer
- Maria Luisa Zubizarreta, Paraguayan linguist
- Maria Luisa Zuloaga de Tovar (1902–1992), Venezuelan artist

== See also ==
- Maria Luisa (disambiguation)
- Luisa Maria
- Maria Louisa
- Maria Louise
- Maria Luise
- Maria Luiza (disambiguation)
- Marie Louise (disambiguation)
- Marie Luise
- Queen Maria Luisa (disambiguation)
