= Louise =

Louise most commonly refers to:

- Louise (given name)

Louise or Luise may also refer to:

== Arts and entertainment ==
=== Songs ===
- "Louise" (Maurice Chevalier song), 1929
- "Louise" (The Human League song), 1984
- "Louise" (Bonnie Tyler song), 2005
- "Louise" (Jett Rebel song), 2013
- "Louise", by The Yardbirds from the album Five Live Yardbirds, 1964
- "Louise", by Paul Revere & the Raiders from the album The Spirit of '67, 1966
- "Louise", by Paul Siebel from the album Woodsmoke and Oranges, 1970, also covered by Linda Ronstadt, Ian Matthews, Bonnie Raitt, Eric Andersen, Jerry Jeff Walker, Leo Kottke, and others
- "Louise", by Clan of Xymox from the album Medusa, 1986
- "Louise", by NOFX from the album Pump Up the Valuum, 2000
- "Louise", by Taylor Hawkins and the Coattail Riders from the album Taylor Hawkins and the Coattail Riders, 2006
- "Louise", by TV Girl from the album French Exit, 2014

=== Other arts and entertainment ===
- Louise (2003 film), a Canadian animated short film by Anita Lebeau
- Louise (opera), an opera by Charpentier
  - Louise (1939 film), a French film based on the opera

== People ==
- Helli Louise (1949–2018), Danish-born British actress
- Merle Louise (1934–2025), American actress
- Princess Louise (disambiguation), various princesses
- Queen Louise (disambiguation), various queens

== Ships ==
- USS Louise, various ships
- Louise (steamship), a steamship that operated on the Chesapeake Bay

== Other uses ==
- List of storms named Louise, various tropical cyclones
- Louise cake, a New Zealand dessert
- Louise metro station in Brussels

== See also ==
- "40 Day Dream"/"Geez Louise", by Edward Sharpe and the Magnetic Zeros, 2009
- Lake Louise (disambiguation)
- Lewis (disambiguation)
- Lois
- Louis (disambiguation)
- Louisa (disambiguation)
- Louise (Take 2), a 1998 French film
- "Louise's Song", by Stan Rogers from the posthumous compilation album From Coffee House to Concert Hall, 1999
- Louiseville
- Lovisa
- Ludwig (disambiguation)
- Luis (disambiguation)
- Luisa
- Marie Louise (disambiguation)
- Mary Louise (disambiguation)
- SS Louise Lykes, various ships
