= Marie Luise =

Marie Luise or Marie-Luise may refer to:

- Marie Luise Bulst-Thiele (1906–1992), German historian
- Marie Luise von Degenfeld (1634-1677), Countess
- Marie-Luise Dött (born 1953), German politician
- Marie Luise Droop (1890–1959), German writer, director and producer
- Marie-Luise Gansberg (1933-2003), German literary scholar
- Marie-Luise Gehlen, German footballer
- Marie-Luise Gothein (1863-1931), Prussian scholar, gardener and author
- Marie-Luise Jahn (1918–2010), German physician and resistance member
- Marie Luise Kaschnitz (1901-1974), German short story writer, novelist, essayist and poet
- Marie-Luise Marjan (born 1940), German actress
- Marie-Luise Neunecker (born 1955), German horn player and professor
- Marie-Luise Scherer (1938–2022), German writer and journalist
- Marie-Luise Schramm (born 1984), German actress

== See also ==
- Maria Louisa
- Maria Louise
- Maria Luisa
- Maria Luise
- Marie Louise (disambiguation)
