= Louise (given name) =

Louíse
- Pronunciation: /luˈiːz/ loo-EEZ
- Gender: Female

Origin
- Origin: German; French
- Meaning: "Famous warrior"

Other names
- Nicknames: Lou; Louie; Lulu; Weazy; Weezy; Louisette; Louweazy
- Related names: Eloise; Aloisia; Louisa; Luisa; Luiza; Ludwika

Louise and Luise are, respectively, French and German feminine forms of the given name Louis. Louise has been regularly used as a female name in English-speaking countries since the middle of the 19th century. It has ranked among the top 100 names given to girls in France, England, Ireland, Scotland, Sweden and Wales in recent years. It last ranked among the top 1,000 first names for girls born in the United States in 1991, but remains a more common middle name.

== Variants ==
- Aloisia: German, Italian, Spanish
- Aloisie: Czech
- Alojza: Polish
- Alojzia: Hungarian, Slovak
- Alojzija: Slovene
- Heloísa: Portuguese
- Labhaoise: Irish
- Liisa: Finnish, Estonian
- Liudvika: Lithuanian
- Lluïsa: Catalan
- Loes: Dutch
- Lou: English, French
- Louella: English
- Louisa: English
- Louise: Danish, Dutch, English, French, Norwegian, Swedish
- Louiza: Greek (Λουίζα), Kabyle
- Louize: Danish, Dutch
- Lova: Swedish
- Loviisa: Finnish
- Loviise: Estonian
- Lovisa: Swedish
- Lovise: Danish, Norwegian
- Lu: English
- Luana: English, Portuguese
- Luann: English
- Luanne: English
- Ludovica: Italian, Latin
- Ludwika: Polish
- Luella: English
- Luigia: Italian
- Luigina: Italian
- Luisa: Italian, Spanish, Estonian
- Luísa: Portuguese
- Luise: German, Estonian
- Luisella: Italian
- Luīz: Portuguese, English
- Luiza: Polish, Portuguese, Romanian, Russian (Луиза), Albanian
- Luīze: Latvian
- Lujza: Hungarian, Slovak
- Lula: English
- Lulu: English, German
- Luyiza: Ukrainian (Луїза)
- Ruiha: Māori

== People with the name ==
=== Arts ===
- Louise Blanchard Bethune (1856–1913), American architect
- Louise Bennett (1919–2006), Jamaican poet and folklorist
- Louise Bourgeois (1911–2010), French sculptor
- Louise Cotnoir (1948–2024), Canadian writer
- Louise Murray (1854–1931), American local historian and museum director
- Louise Nevelson (1899–1988), American sculptor
- Louise Robert (1941–2022), Canadian painter
- Louise Schatz (1916–1997), Canadian-born Israeli artist and designer
- Louise Théo (1854–1922), French singer
- Louise Cooper Spindle (1885–1968), American composer

=== Entertainment ===
- Louise Abuel (born 2003), Filipino teen actor
- Louise Beavers (1902–1962), African-American film and television actress
- Louise Bourgoin (born 1981), French actress
- Louise Brealey (born 1979), English actress
- Louise Brooks (1906–1985), American silent film actress
- Louise Cardoso (born 1955), Brazilian actress, producer and theatre instructor
- Louise delos Reyes (born 1992), Filipino actress
- Louise Fletcher (1934–2022), American actress
- Louise Gold (born 1956), British actress and puppeteer
- Luise Gruber (born 1982), Austrian blues singer-songwriter professionally known as Saint Lu
- Louise Harman (born 1985), British rapper better known as Lady Sovereign
- Louise Harrison, British actress
- Louise Jameson (born 1951), British actress
- Louise Labèque (born 2003), French actress
- Louise Lasser (born 1939), American actress
- Louise Linden (1862–1934), American saxophonist
- Louise Madison (1911–1970), American tap dancer
- Louise Michaëli (1830–1875), Swedish opera singer
- Louise Plowright (1956–2016), British actress
- Louise Poitevin (c. 1820–1908), French balloonist, pioneer of aviation
- Luise Rainer (1910–2014), German-Austrian-American actress
- Louise Redknapp (born 1974), British singer professionally known simply as Louise

=== Literature ===
- Louise Adler (born 1954), Australian publisher and academic
- Luise Aston (1814–1871), German author
- Louise Bogan (1897–1970), American poet
- Louise Bombardier (born 1953), Canadian actress and writer
- Louise Briggs (1870–1945), English teacher and Esperanto translator
- Louise Compain (1869–1941), French feminist author
- Louise Cooper (fantasy writer) (1952–2009), British writer
- Louise Erdrich (born 1954), American novelist and poet
- Louise Flodin (1828–1923), Swedish journalist and publisher
- Louise E. Francis (1869–1932), American journalist, editor, publisher, and author
- Louise Glück (1943–2023), American poet and essayist who won the 2020 Nobel Prize in Literature
- Luise Gottsched (1713–1762), German poet, playwright, essayist, and translator
- Louise Granberg (1812–1907), Swedish playwright
- Louise Hay (1926–2017), American motivational author and publisher
- Luise Hensel (1798–1876), German religious author and poet
- Louise Herschman Mannheimer (1845–1920), Czech-American writer, poet, school founder, and inventor
- Louise Manning Hodgkins (1846–1935), American educator, author, and editor
- Louise Kennedy (born 1967), Irish writer
- Louise Wareham Leonard (born 1965), American author
- Louise Markscheffel (1857–1911), American journalist, editor, and critic
- Louise Chandler Moulton (1835–1908), American poet, story-writer, and critic
- Susanna Louise Patteson (1853–1922), American stenographer, educator and author
- Louise Rennison (1951–2016), English author and comedian
- Louise Willis Snead (1868–1958), American writer, lecturer, and artist
- Louise Stockton (1838–1914), American author, journalist, club organizer
- Luise von Ploennies (1803–1872), German poet
- Louise Collier Willcox (1865–1929), American author, editor, anthologist, translator, and suffragist

=== Politics ===
- Louise Da-Cocodia (1934–2008), British anti-racism campaigner and Deputy Lord Lieutenant of Manchester
- Louise Ellman, British politician
- Louise Feltham (1935–2020), Canadian politician
- Louise Haigh, British politician
- Louise Hardy (born 1959), Canadian politician
- Bi-khim Louise Hsiao (born 1971), 13th Vice President of the Republic of China (Taiwan), also known as Hsiao Bi-khim
- Louise Louring (born 1992), Danish politician
- Louise Marcos (born 1959), Filipina lawyer, first lady of the Philippines since 2022, wife of 17th Philippine President Bongbong Marcos
- Louise Michel (1830-1905), French revolutionary, major figure of the Paris Commune.
- Louise Minnhagen (born 1969), Swedish politician
- Louise Moreau (1921–2001), French politician
- Louise Mörk (born 1993), Swedish politician
- Luise Neuhaus-Wartenberg (born 1980), German politician
- Louise Secker, American politician
- Louise Thibault (born 1946), Canadian politician

=== Royalty and nobility ===
- Princess Louise (disambiguation), various princesses
  - Lady Louise Windsor (born 2003), granddaughter of Elizabeth II, Queen of the United Kingdom and only daughter of Prince Edward, Duke of Edinburgh
- Queen Louise (disambiguation), various queens
- Louise de Brézé (1521–1577), French noble and spouse of Claude, Duke of Aumale
- Luise von Degenfeld (1634–1677), countess and morganatic spouse of Charles I Louis, Elector Palatine
- Duchess Luise of Brunswick-Wolfenbüttel (1722–1780), daughter of Ferdinand Albert II, Duke of Brunswick-Wolfenbüttel
- Louise d'Orléans (1869–1952), Princess Alfons of Bavaria
- Louise of Stolberg-Wernigerode (1771–1856), countess and abbess of Drübeck Abbey
- Louise de Mérode (1819–1868), Belgian noble and spouse of Carlo Emanuele dal Pozzo della Cisterna
- Archduchess Louise of Austria (1870–1947), daughter of Ferdinand IV, Grand Duke of Tuscany

=== Sports ===
- Louise Baxter (born 1983), Scottish field hockey defender
- Louise Brough (1923–2014), American tennis player
- Louise Carroll (born 1982), Scottish field hockey defender
- Louise Christie (born 2000), Scottish rhythmic gymnast
- Louise Cooper, former footballer
- Luise Krüger (1915–2001), German athlete
- Louise Lieberman (born 1977), American soccer coach and former player
- Louise Miller (born 1960), English high jumper
- Louise Petersen (1894–1983), Danish diver
- Louise Sauvage (born 1973), Australian Paralympic athlete
- Louise Vanhille (born 1998), French gymnast

=== Other people ===
- Louise Arbour (born 1947), Canadian lawyer and jurist
- Louise Archer (1893–1948), American teacher and activist
- Louise Branscomb (1901–1999), American physician
- Louise Brown (born 1978), first human to be born after in vitro fertilisation, in the UK
- Louise Charron (born 1951), Canadian lawyer
- Louise L. Chase (1840–1906), American social reformer
- Louise Cooper, British financial analyst
- Louise Courteix Adanson (born 1950), French horticulturalist, businesswoman
- Louise de Marillac (1591–1660), French co-founder of the Daughters of Charity and Roman Catholic saint
- Louise Filion (born 1945), Canadian professor of biogeography
- Luise Hartnack (1872–1942), German Holocaust victim
- Luise Hercus (1926–2018), German-born Australian linguist
- Louise Jensen (died 1994), Danish murder victim
- Louise Jordan (1908–1966), American petroleum geologist
- Louise Kessenich-Grafemus (1786–1852), Prussian officer
- Louise M. Lawson (1855–1951), American temperance activist
- Louise Macdonald, national director of the Institute of Directors in Scotland
- Louise Mackay (1904–2001), Australian activist
- Louise Davis McMahon (1873–1966), American philanthropist
- Louise O'Sullivan (born 1973), Irish telecommunications executive
- Louise Odin (1836–1909), Swiss linguist, dialect researcher and author
- Louise du Pierry (1746–1807), French astronomer, the Sorbonne's first female professor.
- Louise C. Purington (1844–1916), American physician and temperance movement leader
- Louise de Ramezay (1705–1776), Canadian businesswoman from Montreal
- Louise Ravelli (born 1963), Australian linguist
- Louise Signal, New Zealand professor of public health
- Louise Reed Stowell (1850–1932), American scientist and author
- Louise Thaden (1905–1979), American aviation pioneer
- Louise van den Plas (1877–1968), Belgian suffragist
- Louise Adelaide Wolf (1898–1962), American mathematician and university professor

== Fictional characters ==
- Lighthouse Louise, a female snail from the SpongeBob SquarePants episode "Lighthouse Louie". She used to be named Louie, but when she revealed that she has newborn baby snails, she became Louise.
- Louise, a character in the manga and anime series Attack on Titan
- Louise the Lady of Violets, wife of the sage Lord Pent and a character in Fire Emblem: The Blazing Blade
- Louise Banks, Amy Adams's character in Arrival
- Louise Belcher, one of the main characters in animated sitcom Bob's Burgers
- Louise Brooks, one of the main characters in the BBC sitcom Two Pints of Lager and a Packet of Crisps
- Louise Darling, a friend of Ruby with brown fur in Max & Ruby
- Louise Grimsley, long-running character in the crime/mystery serial The Edge of Night
- Louise Halevy, supporting character from the Gundam 00 franchise
- Louise "Weezie" Jefferson, neighbor of Archie Bunker in All in the Family and a main character in the spin-off The Jeffersons
- Louise Françoise le Blanc de la Vallière, the female protagonist in the light novel, anime, and manga series Zero no Tsukaima
- Louise Maigret (née Leonard), wife of Inspector Jules Maigret, a fictional detective in novels by Georges Simenon
- Louise Mallard, main character from "The Story of an Hour" by Kate Chopin
- Louise "Lulu" Moppet, the main character of Little Lulu comics
- Louise Sawyer, one of the title characters of the movie Thelma & Louise
- Louise Sidell, the title character's closest friend in the Penny Parker books
- Louise, a character from Touhou Project
- Louise, one of the characters in the Harry and Louise political advertising campaign of 1993–94, portrayed by actress Louise Caire Clark

== See also ==
- Lois
- Lovisa
- Lowiena
- Marie Louise
- Mary Louise (name)
