= Mary Louise (name) =

People with the name Mary Louise include:

- Mary Louise Baker (1920–2007), better known as Joan Barry (American actress), American aspiring actress
- Mary Louise Boehm (1924–2002), American pianist and painter
- Mary Louise Booth (1831–1889), American editor, translator, and writer
- Mary Louise Brooks (1906–1985), better known as Louise Brooks, American actress and dancer
- Marylouise Burke, American actress
- Mary Louise Curtis (1876–1970), American philanthropist
- Mary Louise Defender Wilson (born 1930), Native American storyteller
- Mary Louise Graffam (1871–1921), American teacher
- Mary Louise Guinan (1884–1933), better known as Texas Guinan, American actress
- Mary Louise Hancock (1920–2017), American politician
- Mary Louise Kekuewa (1926–2008), American Hawaiian master feather worker, teacher
- Mary Louise Kelly (born 1971), American broadcaster and author
- Mary Louise Lester (1919–1977), American baseball player
- Mary Louise McLaughlin (1847–1939), American pottery artist
- Mary-Louise McLaws (1953–2023), Australian epidemiologist
- Mary Louise Milliken Childs (1873–1936), American philanthropist
- Mary-Louise Parker (born 1964), American actress
- Mary Louise Peebles (1833–1915), American author
- Mary Louise Pratt (born 1948), American academic
- Mary Louise Preis (born 1941), American politician
- Mary Louise Rasmuson (1911–2012), American military officer
- Mary Louise Roberts (historian), American historian
- Mary Louise Roberts (1886–1968), better known as Louie Roberts, New Zealand masseuse
- Mary Louise Smith (disambiguation), multiple people
- Mary Louise Snowden, better known as M.L. Snowden, American sculptor
- Mary Louise St. John (1943–2003), American nun
- Mary Louise Streep (born 1949), better known as Meryl Streep, American actress
- Mary Louise Tobin (1918–2022), better known as Louise Tobin, American singer
- Mary Louise Weller (born 1946), American actress
- Mary Louise White Aswell (1902–1984), writer under the pen name Patrick Quentin
- Mary Louise Whitty, birth name of May Whitty (1865–1948), English stage- and film actress
- Mary Louise Wilson (born 1931), American actress
- Mary Louise Wright (1923–2004), American figure skater

== See also ==
- Mary Louise (disambiguation)
- Marie Louise (disambiguation)
- Maria Louisa
- Mary Louisa
- Mary Lou (name)
- Marylou (disambiguation)
- Marilu (disambiguation)
- Mary (given name)
- Louise (given name)
