= Arencibia =

Arencibia is a surname. Notable people with the surname include:

- Francisco Arencibia (1912–2004), Cuban-Spanish footballer
- Gregorio Aldo Arencibia (born 1947), Cuban cyclist
- Humberto Arencibia (born 1989), Cuban freestyle wrestler
- J. P. Arencibia (born 1986), Cuban-American baseball player
- Luis Arencibia (1946–2021), Spanish sculptor
- María Luisa Arencibia (born 1959), Venezuelan composer, organist and teacher
- Mario Arencibia (born 1924), Cuban baseball player
- Sadaise Arencibia (born c. 1981), Cuban ballet dancer
- Walter Arencibia (born 1967), Cuban chess grandmaster
- Yenima Arencibia (born 1984), Cuban sprint hurdler
- Yordanis Arencibia (born 1980), Cuban judoka

== See also ==
- Arancibia, a surname
