= Maria Louise =

Maria Louise may refer to:

- Maria Louise Baldwin (1856–1922), African American educator and civic leader
- Maria Louise Eve (1842–1900), American poet
- Maria Louise Kirk (1860–1938), an American painter and illustrator
- Maria Louise Pool (1841–1898), American writer
- Princess Maria Louise, a character in the fictional anime Mobile Fighter G Gundam

== See also ==
- Maria Louisa
- Maria Luisa
- Maria Luise
- Marie Louise (disambiguation)
- Marie Luise
