= Luiza =

- Gender: Female

Origin
- Region of origin: Albania, Brazil, Poland, Portugal, Russia

Other names
- Related names: Louisa, Luisa, Louise, Eloise, Aloisia

Luiza is a feminine given name, most commonly found in the Greek, Albanian, Polish, Portuguese, Romanian and Russian languages. People bearing the name Luiza include:

- Luiza Almeida (born 1991), Brazilian dressage rider
- Luiza Helena de Bairros (1953–2016), Brazilian administrator and sociologist
- Luiza Bialasiewicz (born 1971), Polish-Italian political geographer
- Luiza Borac, Romanian pianist
- Luíza Brunet (born 1962), Brazilian model
- Luiza Campos (born 1990), Brazilian rugby sevens player
- Luiza Coppieters (born 1979), Brazilian politician, LGBTQ+ activist, and educator
- Luíza Curvo (born 1985), Brazilian actress
- Luiza Erundina (born 1934), Brazilian politician
- Luiza Fullana (born 2001), Brazilian tennis player
- Luiza Galiulina (born 1992), Uzbek gymnast
- Luiza Ganieva (born 1995), Uzbek rhythmic gymnast
- Luiza Gega (born 1988), Albanian middle-distance runner
- Luiza Ghazaryan (born 2000), Armenian footballer
- Luiza Licina-Bode, German politician
- Luiza Machado (born 1965), Brazilian volleyball player
- Luiza Mariani (born 1980), Brazilian actress and producer
- Luiza Melencu (2000–2019), Romanian murder victim
- Luiza Monteiro (born 1988), Brazilian submission grappler and 2nd degree black belt Brazilian jiu-jitsu competitor
- Luiza Noskova (born 1968), Russian biathlete
- Luiza Pendyk (born 1970), Polish football player
- Luiza Pesjak (1828–1898), Slovene writer
- Luiza Possi (born 1984), Brazilian pop singer
- Luiza Prado (born 1988), Brazilian transdisciplinary artist
- Luiza Rasulova (born 1995), Uzbek actress and presenter
- Luiza Sá (born 1983), Brazilian guitar player (Cansei de Ser Sexy)
- Luiza Saidiyeva (born 1994), Kazakh archer
- Luiza Savage (born 19??), Canadian journalist and editor
- Luiza Trajano (born 1948), Brazilian billionaire businessperson
- Luíza Tomé (born 1961), Brazilian actress
- Luiza Valdetaro, Brazilian actress and businesswoman
- Luiza Złotkowska (born 1986), Polish speed skater
- Luiza Zavloschi (1883-1967), Romanian politician

== See also ==
- Luisa
