= Mary Louise Smith =

Mary Louise Smith may refer to:

- Mary Louise Smith (activist) (born 1937), American civil rights protester
- Mary Louise Smith (politician) (1914–1997), U.S. political organizer and women's rights activist

== See also ==
- Mary Karadja (1868–1943, born Marie Louise Smith), Swedish spiritual medium and writer
- Mary Pickford (1892–1979, born Gladys Louise Smith), American silent film era actress
- Louise Noun-Mary Louise Smith Iowa Women's Archives, University of Iowa Libraries
- Mary Louise (name)
- Mary Louise (disambiguation)
- Mary Smith (disambiguation)
- Louise Smith (disambiguation)
