= Marie-Lou =

Marie-Lou is a feminine compound given name which may refer to:

- Marie-Lou Marcel (born 1953), French politician
- Marie-Lou Nahhas, Lebanese-born American actress, model and activist
- Marie-Lou Sellem (born 1966), German actress - see, for example, Charlie's Angels (2019 film)
- Marie-Lou Dubouchon, a character in Tom-Tom and Nana, a French comic strip

== See also ==
- Mary Lou (disambiguation)
- Marie-Louise
