= Amiet =

Amiet is a surname. Notable people with the surname include:

- Cuno Amiet (1868–1961), Swiss painter, illustrator, graphic artist, and sculptor
- Marie Louise Amiet (1879–1944), French painter and illustrator
- Pierre Amiet (1922–2021), French archeologist and conservator
- William Amiet (1890–1959), Australian writer and barrister
