= Mary Louise =

Mary Louise may refer to:

- Mary Louise (name), a name (including a list of persons with the name)
- Mary Louise (novel), a children's book by L. Frank Baum writing as Edith Van Dyne
- USS Mary Louise (SP-356), a US navy ship in service in 1917
- Mary Louise (actor), a child prodigy appearing in The Bird's Christmas Carol directed by Lule Warrenton
- Mary Louise (horse), the 1937 winner of the Swedish Trotting Criterium

== See also ==
- Marie Louise (disambiguation)
- Mary Lou (disambiguation)
- Marylou (disambiguation)
- Mary Louisa, common double given name
- Mary (given name)
- Louise (given name)
- Louise (disambiguation)
- Mary (disambiguation)
