= Lowiena =

- Gender: Female
- Language: Dutch

Origin
- Meaning: Famous warrior

Other names
- See also: Louise, Lovisa

Lowiena is a Dutchified form of the feminine given name Louise that has been used in the Netherlands since at least the 19th century. Although still rare, it is more common in the northern part of the country (Friesland, Groningen and Drenthe).
