= Maria Luisa (disambiguation) =

Maria Luisa is a feminine compound given name. It may also refer to:

== Places ==
- Aldea María Luisa, town in Entre Ríos Province, Argentina
- María Luisa, Argentina, a town in Santa Fe Province

== Ships ==
- SS Maria Luisa, a number of ships with this name

== See also ==
- Maria Luisa cake, a dessert in Salvadorean cuisine
- Parque de María Luisa, a park in Seville, Spain
- Order of Queen Maria Luisa, created by King Charles IV of Spain in 1792 to recognize noblewomen who had distinguished themselves
- Spanish ship Reina María Luisa, a Spanish Navy ship of the line
