= Kate Rankin =

American neuropsychologist

Katherine P. Rankin
- Education: Yale University; Fuller Seminary
- Scientific career
- Workplaces: University of California, San Francisco
- Thesis: Neuropsychological performance before and after coronary artery bypasss graft surgery without coronary bypass pump : a prospective, randomized trial (1999)

Kate Rankin is an American neuropsychologist who is a professor at the University of California, San Francisco.

== Early life and education ==
Rankin earned her bachelor’s degree in psychology from Yale University. She completed her doctoral research in clinical psychology, investigating neuropsychological performance before and after coronary artery bypass graft surgery. She earned a master’s degree in theology at Fuller Seminary School of Psychology. She undertook a clinical internship at the Veterans' Affairs Northern California Health Care System’s Martinez Outpatient Clinic and the UC Davis Medical Center, followed by a postdoctoral fellowship in neuropsychology at University of California, San Francisco.

== Career ==
Rankin joined the UCSF Department of Neurology as a neuropsychologist in the Memory and Aging Center. Her work integrates clinical neuropsychology with structural and functional neuroimaging to study the neural mechanisms underlying personality, empathy, social cognition and emotional processing. She has demonstrated that early changes in socioemotional processing can support earlier and more precise diagnosis. For example, Rankin showed that an inability to detect sarcasm and lies may be an early indicator of dementia.

Rankin has developed assessment tools for evaluating socioemotional functioning in individuals with cognitive impairment. She has developed medical tests, which measure empathy, theory of mind, personality traits and social signal comprehension. These have been adopted by Alzheimer’s Disease Research Centers across the United States to improve diagnostic accuracy for neurological disorders, including dementia, progressive aphasia and corticobasal syndrome).

== Research and career ==
Rankin develops informatics tools that support the harmonisation of cross‑disciplinary data and analytical workflows, enabling more effective scientific collaboration, faster discovery and improved clinical decision‑making.

== Selected publications ==
- Clifford R Jack; David A Bennett; Kaj Blennow; et al. (1 April 2018). "NIA-AA Research Framework: Toward a biological definition of Alzheimer's disease". Alzheimer's and Dementia. 14 (4): 535–562. doi:10.1016/j.jalz.2018.02.018. ISSN 1552-5260. PMC 5958625. PMID 29653606. Wikidata Q52589491.
- Katya Rascovsky; John R Hodges; David Knopman; et al. (September 2011). "Sensitivity of revised diagnostic criteria for the behavioural variant of frontotemporal dementia". Brain. 134 (Pt 9): 2456–77. doi:10.1093/brain/awr179. ISSN 0006-8950. PMC 3170532. PMID 21810890. Wikidata Q24598142.
- Maria Luisa Gorno-Tempini; Nina F Dronkers; Katherine P Rankin; et al. (March 2004). "Cognition and anatomy in three variants of primary progressive aphasia". Annals of Neurology. 55 (3): 335–46. doi:10.1002/ana.10825. ISSN 0364-5134. PMC 2362399. PMID 14991811. Wikidata Q24650108.
