= Maria Smith =

Maria Smith may refer to:

- Maria Smith (actress), eighteenth century British actress
- Maria Ann Smith (1799–1870), British-Australian fruit grower known as "Granny Smith"
- Maria Geraldine Smith (born 1961), British politician

== See also ==
- Maria Smith-Falkner (1878–1968), Soviet economist and statistician
- Maria Smith Abdy
- Marie Smith (disambiguation)
- Maria Smythe
- Mary Smith (disambiguation)
