= Queen Maria Luisa =

Queen Maria Luisa may refer to:

- Marie Louise d'Orléans (1662–1689), queen consort of Charles II of Spain
- Maria Luisa Gabriella of Savoy (1688–1714), queen consort of Philip V of Spain
- Maria Luisa of Parma (1751–1819), queen consort of Charles IV of Spain
- Maria Luisa of Spain (1782–1824), queen consort of Ludovico I of Etruria
- Marie Louise of Austria (1791–1847), consort of Napoleon I, Emperor of the French and King of Italy

== See also ==
- Maria Luisa
- Queen Mary (disambiguation)
- Spanish ship Reina María Luisa, meant Queen Maria Luisa in Spanish
