= Loyce =

Loyce is a female given name. Notable people with this name include:

- Loyce Biira Bwambale
- Loyce Houlton (1925–1995), American dancer, choreographer, dance pedagogue, and arts administrator
- Loyce Pace, American public health policy expert
- Loyce W. Turner
- Loyce Whiteman, American popular singer

== See also ==
- Lois
