= Arancibia =

Arancibia is a surname of Basque origins. Spelling variations include Arencibia and Aranzubia. Notable people with the surname include:

- Alex Arancibia (born 1990), Bolivian footballer
- Carlos Arancibia (1911–1987), Chilean footballer
- Carmen Gloria Quintana Arancibia (born 1967), Chilean activist
- Daniel Aranzubia (born 1979), Spanish footballer
- David Padilla Arancibia (born 1927), Bolivian general and president
- Eduardo Arancibia (born 1976), Chilean footballer
- Ernesto Arancibia (1904–1963), Argentine film director
- Francisco Arancibia (born 1996), Chilean footballer
- Franz Arancibia (born 1967), Chilean footballer
- Iván Arancibia (died 2011), perpetrator of the 1999 Valparaíso school shootings
- Jerónimo Méndez Arancibia (1887–1959), Chilean politician and government minister
- Jorge Arancibia (born 1939), Chilean politician and lawyer
- José María Arancibia (born 1937), Argentine archbishop
- Manuel Arancibia (1908–1987), Chilean footballer
- Matías Leiva Arancibia (born 1999), Chilean footballer

== See also ==
- Arancibia District, Puntarenas, Costa Rica
- Basque surnames
