= Lovisa =

- Gender: Female

Origin
- Meaning: warrior
- Region of origin: Sweden

Other names
- Related names: Louise, Louisa, Luise, Luisa, Ludvig

Lovisa is a Swedified form of Louise, which originates in Louis and has been used in Sweden since the 17th century. It was placed in the Swedish calendar in the 1750s after king Adolf Fredericks marriage to Lovisa Ulrika of Prussia in 1744. Lovisa means fighter.

The name Lovisa had a rejuvenation in the 1980s and 90's in Sweden but has since then begun to decline.

Lovisa is placed in the Swedish calendar (namnsdag) on August 25.

== Famous people with the name Lovisa ==
Royalty

- Lovisa of Sweden, Queen of Denmark
- Lovisa Ulrika of Prussia, Queen of Sweden

Artists

- Lovisa Augusti, opera singer, member of the Swedish Royal Academy of Music
- Brigitte Lovisa Fouché, French artist
- Greta Lovisa Gustafsson (aka Greta Garbo), Swedish and American actress

Other famous people

- Lovisa Åhrberg, Swedish doctor and surgeon
- Lovisa von Burghausen, Swedish prisoner of war, known for her life as a slave in Russia
- Sofia Lovisa Gråå, Swedish educator and principal
- Agatha Lovisa de la Myle (died 1787), Baltic-German and Latvian poet
- Lovisa Svensson (1853–1963), 109-year-old oldest living person.

== Places ==
- Loviisa
