= Lake Louise =

Lake Louise may refer to:

== Canada ==
- Lake Louise (Alberta), a lake in Alberta
  - Lake Louise, Alberta, a hamlet which takes its name from the lake
    - Chateau Lake Louise, hotel in Alberta, one of Canada's Grand Railway Resorts
    - Lake Louise Ski Resort, a ski resort in Lake Louise, Alberta
- Lake Louise (Estrie), a lake in Weedon, Chaudière-Appalaches, Quebec
- Lake Louise (Manitoba)

== United Kingdom ==
- Lake Louise (Skibo Castle), a small artificial lake in Scotland

== United States ==
- Lake Louise, Alaska, a census-designated place, and a large lake in Matanuska-Susitna Borough, Alaska
- Thumb Lake, a lake in Northern Michigan also known as Lake Louise
- Lake Louise (Douglas County, Minnesota)
- Lake Louise State Park, a park in Mower County, Minnesota
- Lake Louise (Roaring Gap, North Carolina)
- Lake Louise (Pennsylvania), in Luzerne County

== See also ==
- Lac-Saint-Louis, an electoral district in Quebec, Canada
- Lake Louisa (Quebec), Canada
- Lake Louisa, a lake in Murray County, Minnesota, United States
- Lake Louisa State Park, Florida, United States
- Lake Saint-Louis, Quebec, Canada
- Lake St. Louis, Missouri, United States
- Louise (disambiguation)
