= When You Come Back to Me (film) =

1953 film by José Baviera

- Directed by: José Baviera
- Written by: Salvador Abularach; José Baviera; María Luz Perea
- Produced by: Salvador Abularach
- Cinematography: Jorge Stahl Jr.
- Edited by: Carlos Savage
- Music by: Carlos Jiménez Mabarak
- Production company: Productora Centro-Americana
- Release date: 2 September 1953
- Countries: Guatemala; Mexico
- Language: Spanish

When You Come Back To Me (Spanish: Cuando vuelvas a mí) is a 1953 drama film directed by José Baviera. It was a co-production between Mexico and Guatemala.

== Cast ==
- Ramón Armengod
- Lilia del Valle
- José Baviera
- Mario Abularach
- Luis Aguirre
- Antonio Almorza
- María Luisa Aragón
- Enrique Arce Vélez
- Olga de Arce
- Mildred Chávez
- Otto Coronado
- Carlos Figueroa
- René García
- Titina Leal
- José Antonio Lemus
- Augusto Monterroso
- Marion del Valle
- Luis Villavicencio

== Bibliography ==
- María Luisa Amador. Cartelera cinematográfica, 1950-1959. UNAM, 1985.
