= Marie Smith =

Marie Smith may refer to:

- Marie Selika Williams (1849–1937), née Marie Smith, American coloratura soprano
- Marie Rose (Delorme) Smith (1861–1960), Métis rancher, homesteader, medicine woman, midwife, and author.
- Mary Karadja (1868–1943, born Marie Louise Smith), Swedish writer and spiritualist
- Marie Smith (activist) (1898–1991), activist in Portland, Oregon
- Marie Lindberg Smith, better known as Marie Louise Lindberg (1918–2005), American mineralogist
- Marie Smith Jones (1918–2008), last surviving speaker of the Eyak language of Southcentral Alaska
- Marie Smith (bowls) (active 1986), lawn bowler from Guernsey

== See also ==
- Maria Smith (disambiguation)
- Mary Smith (disambiguation)
