= Ludwika =

Ludwika is a Polish given name, equivalent of the name Louise. Notable people with the name include:

- Ludwika Jędrzejewicz (1807–1855), sister of Polish composer Frédéric Chopin
- Ludwika Karolina Radziwiłł (1667–1695), magnate of the Grand Duchy of Lithuania in the Polish-Lithuanian Commonwealth and an active reformer
- Ludwika Lubomirska (died 1829), Polish noble lady
- Ludwika Maria Gonzaga (1611–1677), Queen consort to two Polish kings: Władysław IV, and Jan II Kazimierz
- Ludwika Maria Poniatowska (1728–1781), Polish noble lady
- Ludwika Paleta (born 1978), Polish-born Mexican television actress
- Ludwika Maria Rzewuska (1744–1816), Polish noble lady
- Ludwika Wawrzyńska (1908–1955), Polish teacher who worked at an elementary school in Warsaw
- Maria Ludwika Krasińska (1883–1958), Polish noble lady
- Teofilia Ludwika Zasławska (1650–1709), Polish noble lady
