= Maria Louisa =

Maria Louisa may refer to:

- Maria Louisa Angwin (1849–1898), Canadian physician
- Maria Louisa Bustill (1853–1904), American schoolteacher
- Maria Louisa Charlesworth (1819–1880), English religious author
- Maria Louisa Pike (c. 1824 – 1892), American naturalist
- Maria Louisa Walsworth (1822–1859), American missionary

== See also ==
- Maria Louise
- Maria Luisa
- Maria Luise
- Mary Louisa
- Marie Louise (disambiguation)
- Marie Luise
- Maria (given name)
- Louisa (disambiguation)
- Maria (disambiguation)
