= Mary Smith =

Mary Smith may refer to:

== Public officials ==
- Mary Ellen Smith (1861/63–1933), Canadian legislator
- Mary Louise Smith (politician) (1914–1997), American political organizer
- Mary Ann Smith (born 1948), American local-level legislator
- Mary L. Smith (born 1962), American official
- Mary Ann Shallcross Smith (born 1952), member of the Rhode Island House of Representatives
- Mary Smith Jones (1819–1907), née Smith, last First Lady of the Republic of Texas

== Artists, entertainers, screen personalities ==
- Diamond Teeth Mary (1902–2000), American blues singer, born Mary Smith
- Mary Alice Smith (1936–2022), African-American actress
- Mary Lasswell Smith (1905–1994), American author
- Mary Stoker Smith (born 1969), American television personality
- Mary Stuart Smith (1834–1917), American author and translator
- Mary T. Smith (1904–1995), American self-taught painter
- Mary Winifrid Smith (1904–1992), British painter

== Educators, academics, scientists ==
- Mary Smith (psychologist) (1909–1989), Australian child psychologist
- Mary Bell Smith (1818-1894), American educator, social reformer, and writer
- Mary Bentinck Smith (1864–1921), English schoolmistress, headmistress of St Leonards School
- Mary Carter Smith (1919–2007), African-American educator
- Mary Elizabeth Smith (1932–2004), American philologist
- Mary L. Smith (educator) (1936–2020), 11th president of Kentucky State University
- Mary Lee Smith, American researcher and academic
- Mary Perry Smith, American mathematics educator
- Mary Eveline Smith Farwell (1825–1905), American educator who established Lake Forest College

== Others ==
- Mary Alice Tieche Smith (1918–1987), first lady of West Virginia
- Mary Smith (knocker upper), knocker upper in 1930s London
- Mary Fielding Smith (1801–1852), American member of Latter Day Saint movement
- Mary Harris Smith (1844–1934), British accountant and entrepreneur
- Mary Louise Smith (activist) (born 1937), African-American civil rights figure
- Mary Margaret Smith (1893–2006), American supercentenarian
- Mary Rozet Smith (1868–1934), American philanthropist
- Mary Smith Hayward (1842–1938), née Smith, American businesswoman
- Mary Laurinda Jane Smith Beatty (1834–1899), née Smith, African-American abolitionist and suffrage advocate
- Mary Smith Lockwood (1831–1922), née Smith, one of the founders of the Daughters of the American Revolution
- Mary Russell Smith, daughter of Scottish-American painter William Thompson Russell Smith, who named the Mary Smith Prize for her
- Mimi Smith (1906–1991), aunt of John Lennon

== Characters ==
- Mary Smith (EastEnders), from the BBC soap opera EastEnders
- Mary Smith (Mary and the Witch's Flower)
- Mary Smith (Neighbours), from the Australian soap opera Neighbours
- B'loody Mary Smith, a character from the Harry Potter-based fan fiction My Immortal

== See also ==
- Mary Louise Smith (disambiguation)
- Maria Smith (disambiguation)
- Marie Smith (disambiguation)
- Mary Smith Peake (1823–1862), American teacher and humanitarian
- Mary Berenson (Mary Smith, 1864–1945), American art historian
- Mary Smythe, fictional character from All My Children
- Alias Mary Smith, a 1932 American mystery crime film
- List of people with surname Smith
