= Luisana Melo =

Venezuelan politician

Minister of Health
- Incumbent
- Assumed office 8 January 2016

Personal details
- Party: United Socialist Party of Venezuela

Luisana Melo is a Venezuelan politician who is currently Minister of Health in the Cabinet of Venezuela.
