= Marie-Louise Mumbu =

Congolese journalist (born 1970)

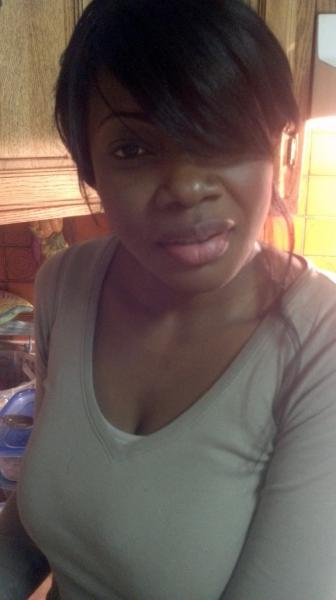
- Born: Mumbu; 15 September 1975
- Citizenship: Congo
- Occupation: Journalist
- Employers: Africultures; Le Potentiel; L'Observateur; The Post
- Notable work: Samantha à Kinshasa: Autobiographie; Carnet De La Création

Marie-Louise Mumbu (born 15 September 1975), also called Bibish, is a Congolese journalist.

Mumbu works for Africultures, Le Potentiel, L'Observateur, and The Post. She lives in Kinshasa and Montreal.

Mumbu is the writer of the memoir Samantha à Kinshasa: Autobiographie, Carnet De La Création, on the Congolese visual artist Francis Mapuya, and Mes Obsessions: j’y pense et puis je crie!
