= Anne Marie Louise =

Anne Marie Louise may refer to:

- Anne Marie Louise d'Orléans (1627–1693), daughter of Gaston, Duke of Orléans;
- Anne Marie Louise of Medici (1574–1616), daughter of Cosimo III, Grand-Duke of Tuscany;
- Anne Marie Louise de La Tour d'Auvergne (1722–1739), daughter of Emmanuel-Théodose de La Tour d'Auvergne, Duke of Bouillon.
