= María Luisa Fernández =

María Luisa Fernández may refer to:

- María Luisa Fernández (gymnast) (born 1943), Spanish Olympic gymnast
- María Luisa Fernández (swimmer) (born 1969), Spanish Olympic swimmer
- María Luisa Fernández (writer) (1870–1938), Chilean writer
