= Lois =

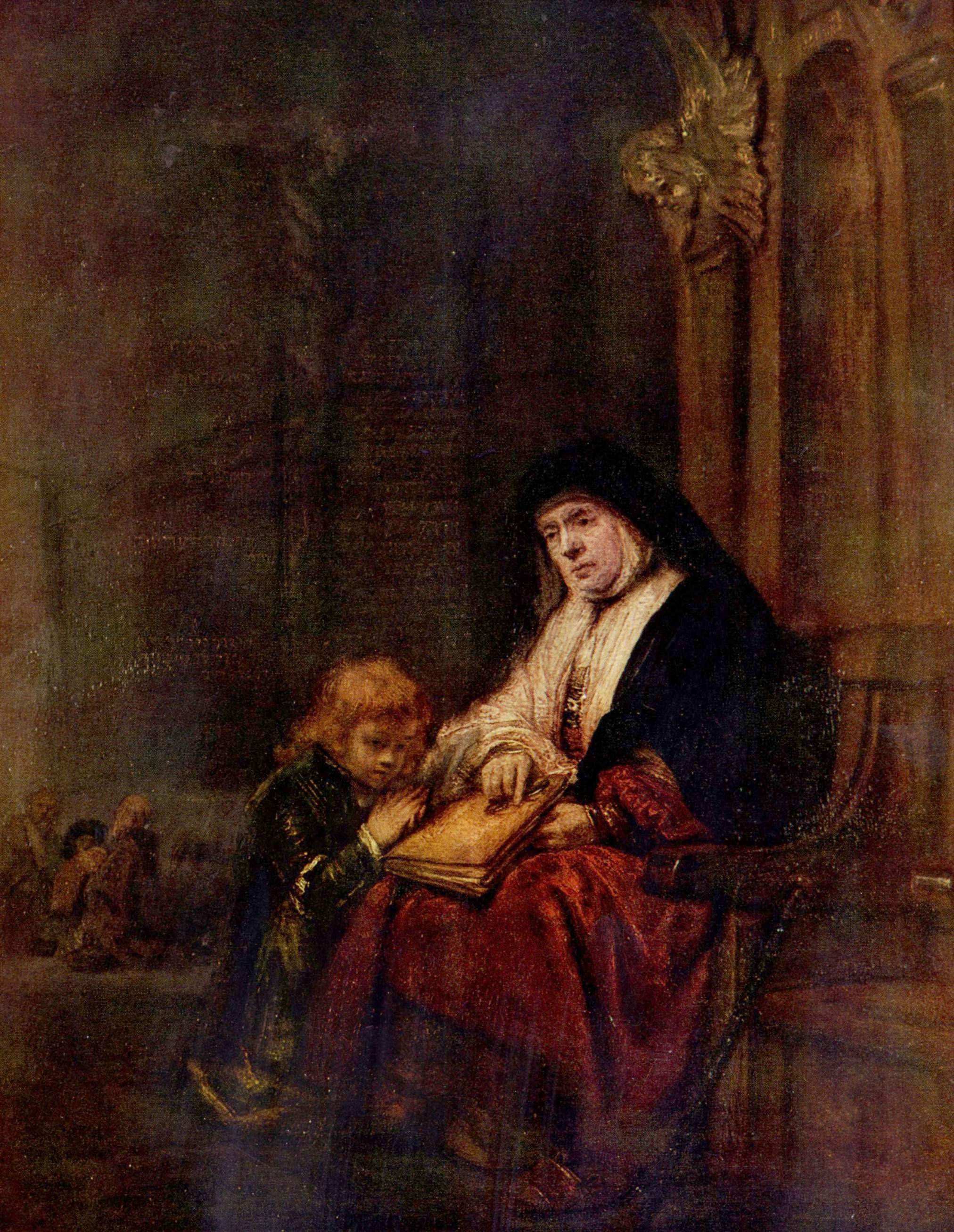
- Rembrandt, Timothy and his Grandmother, 1648
- Gender: Female
- Language: English

Origin
- Meaning: uncertain; allegedly "desirable, agreeable"

Other names
- Derived: From the original Greek Λωΐς

Lois is a common English name from the New Testament. Paul the Apostle mentions Lois, the pious grandmother of Saint Timothy in the Second Epistle to Timothy (commending her for her faith in 2 Timothy 1:5). The name was first used by English Christians after the Protestant Reformation, and it was popular, particularly in North America, during the first half of the 20th century.

== Notable women ==
- Lois Austen-Leigh (1883–1968), English writer and war volunteer
- Lois Bewley (1934–2012), dancer and choreographer
- Lois Bryan Adams (1817–1870), American writer, journalist, newspaper editor
- Lois Aileen Bey, American chemical engineer
- Loïs Boisson (born 2003), French tennis player
- Lois Bryson (1937–2024), Australian sociologist
- Lois McMaster Bujold (born 1949), American author
- Lois Capps, American politician
- Lois Chiles, American actress
- Lois Collier, American actress
- Lois Cox, New Zealand writer
- Lois B. DeFleur, American academic administrator
- Lois Ehlert (1934–2021), American writer and illustrator
- Lois Frankel, American politician
- Lois Haibt, American computer scientist
- Lois Cowles Harrison, American civic leader, women's rights activist, and philanthropist
- Lois Hole, lieutenant governor of Alberta (2000–2005)
- Lois Johnson (1942–2014), American country music singer
- Lois Kolkhorst, American politician
- Lois M. Leveen, American author
- Lois Leaver (born 2002), British slalom canoeist
- Lois Lenski (1893–1974), American author and illustrator
- Lois Lilienstein (1936–2013), American singer
- Lois Long, American writer
- Lois Long (mycologist) (1918–2005), American mycologist
- Lois Lowry (born 1937), American author
- Lois Maffeo (Lois), American musician
- Lois Maxwell (1927–2007), Canadian actress
- Lois McCallin, aviator
- Lois McConnell, lead singer of European EDM group N-Force
- Lois McDonall (born 1939), Canadian opera singer
- Lois McIvor (1930–2017), New Zealand painter
- Lois Meredith, American actress
- Lois Mitchell (born 1939), Canadian politician
- Lois Moran (1909–1990), American actress
- Lois Roberts, Australian murder victim
- Lois Roisman (1938–2008), American activist/playwright/poet
- Lois Smith (born 1930), actress
- Lois Smith (dancer) (1929–2011), Canadian dancer
- Lois Smith (publicist) (1928–2012), American entertainment publicist
- Lois Wilde (1907–1995), American actress
- Lois Wilson (disambiguation), multiple people
- Lois V. Vierk (born 1951), American composer

== Fictional women ==
- Lois the Balloon Fairy, a character in Rainbow Magic.
- Lois the Blue Footed Booby, a character on Bear in the Big Blue House.
- Lois Flagston (née Bailey), a character in the comic strip Hi and Lois.
- Lois Foutley, a character in the animated TV series As Told by Ginger.
- Lois Griffin (née Pewterschmidt), a main character in the animated TV series Family Guy.
- Lois Habiba, a character in the TV series Torchwood: Children of Earth.
- Lois Lane, the Daily Planet reporter in DC Comics.
- Lois Lane, who plays Bianca in the play within the play Kiss Me, Kate.
- Lois Morgan, a character in the TV series Ellen.
- Lois Wilkerson, a character in the TV series Malcolm in the Middle.

== As male name ==
In French, Loïs is a male name, as in the fictional comic strip adventures of Loïs Lorcey by Jacques Martin.

The name Loïs is derived from the name Louis, itself derived from Clovis which is derived from the Germanic root, Hlodowig, which can be interpreted in the sense of "glorious" or "illustrious fighter". Close names include Louys, Luis, Louis, Lorys, Lucio, Leonus, Louniss, Lyes, Clovis, Ludovic, Ludwig, Lovis, and Luigi.

== See also ==
- Lois, Missouri, a community in the United States
- Loïs Lane, a Dutch girl group
- Louise, given name
- Loyce
- Loi, a people of Manipur, India
