= Luis Arencibia =

Spanish sculptor (1946–2021)

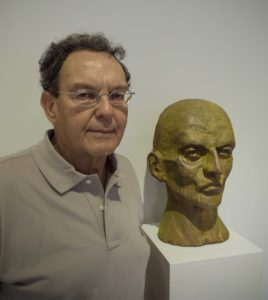
- Luis Arencibia in 2016
- Born: Luis Arencibia Betancort; May 4, 1946; Telde, Spanish State
- Died: March 22, 2021 (aged 74); Leganés, Spain
- Organization: Workers' Commissions
- Known for: Sculpture
- Notable work: Neptuno del Puntón
- Political party: ORT; PSOE; PCE

Luis Arencibia (4 May 1946 – 22 March 2021) was a Spanish sculptor.

Born in Telde, Gran Canaria, he was the son of the muralist José Arencibia Gil (1914–1968). He moved to Madrid to pursue higher studies in Philosophy and Theology, and established his residence in Leganés, a town south of the capital. In the 1970s he took part in the opposition movement to the dictatorship: he was a clandestine member of the Organización Revolucionaria de Trabajadores, the Partido Socialista Obrero Español, and finally the Partido Comunista de España in Leganés, of which he was a member from 1975 to 1986.3 He was also a member of the Comisiones Obreras trade union.

Builder of magnificent Statue of Neptune (Poseidon) in the city of Las Palmas capital of Gran Canaria, one of Spain's Canary Islands.
