= Louisa Stone Stevenson =

American chemist (1879–1969)

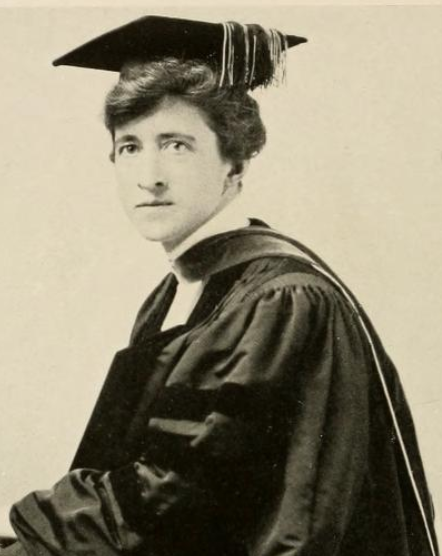
- Louisa Stone Stevenson, from the 1916 yearbook of Sweet Briar College
- Born: December 5, 1879; Lowell, Massachusetts, U.S.
- Died: January 10, 1969 (aged 89); Marblehead, Massachusetts, U.S.
- Occupations: Chemist, college professor

Louisa Stone Stevenson (December 5, 1879 – January 10, 1969) was an American chemist and college professor. She was a chemistry professor at Mount Holyoke College from 1915 to 1945.

== Early life and education ==
Stevenson was born in Lowell, Massachusetts, the daughter of Timothy Findlay Stevenson and Emily (Emma) Louisa Pevey Stevenson. She graduated from Vassar College in 1901, and earned her Ph.D. in chemistry from Cornell University in 1911. She held the Lydia Pratt Babbott Fellowship from Vassar twice, to pursue graduate study in chemistry. She was a member of Phi Beta Kappa and Sigma Xi honor societies.

== Career ==
Stevenson taught at Vassar College after she graduated. She taught at Wellesley College from 1911 to 1913, and at Sweet Briar College from 1913 to 1915, where she succeeded her friend, physician Connie M. Guion, as department head. She became a full professor at Mount Holyoke College in 1919; her colleagues in the chemistry department there included Dorothy Hahn and Emma Perry Carr. She participated in campus theatrical productions, and was faculty advisor to the school's Fellowship of Faiths organization. She was a reader for the College Entrance Examination Board for "many years".

Stevenson retired from teaching at Mount Holyoke with emeritus status in 1945. At that time, the college established a Louisa Stone Stevenson Fund, to award prizes to undergraduates excelling in chemistry. In 1954, she and Emma Perry Carr presided at a ceremony to open a time capsule box from the cornerstone of Shattuck Hall, as the campus building was being demolished.

== Publications ==
- The Fluorescence of Anthracene (1911)

== Personal life ==
Stevenson died in 1969, at the age of 89, at a nursing home in Marblehead, Massachusetts.
