= Mary Lou =

Mary Lou or Marylou may refer to:

== People ==
- Mary Lou (name), including list of persons with this given name
- Mary Lou (actress), American actress Mary Lou Kolbenschlag (born 1992)

== Films ==
- Mary Lou (1928 film), a German silent film
- Mary Lou (1948 film), an American film
- Mary Lou, the working title for the 2018 film Avengers: Infinity War
- Mary Lou 2, the working title for the 2019 film Avengers: Endgame

== Music ==
- Marylou (album), an album by Swiss singer Anna Rossinelli
- "Mary Lou", a 1955 song by Young Jessie
- "Mary Lou", a song by Bruce Springsteen on his 1998 album Tracks

== See also ==
- "Good Bye Mary Lou" a song from the album We Are Him by Angels of Light
- "Hello Mary Lou", a song by Gene Pitney
- Mary Louise (name), also Mary Louisa
- Marie-Lou, a given name
