= Marie-Louise Laleyan =

American architect

- Born: 1935; Bulgaria
- Died: 2014 (aged 78–79)
- Occupation: Architect

Marie-Louise Laleyan (1935–2014) was an American architect.

Laleyan's professional experience as an architect spanned 48 years. She founded Laleyan Associates.

== Experience ==
Laleyan was born and educated in Bulgaria, and practiced architecture in Sofia, Bulgaria; Paris, France. She moved to California, where she worked for Hart & Turner Architects (Sacramento, CA), Richard Neutra (Los Angeles, CA), and the San Francisco, CA firms of Claude Oakland and Associates, Anshen & Allen, Mario J. Ciamp, FAIA, and Paffard Keatinge Clay.

In 1977 Laleyan established her own architecture firm, Laleyan Associates. The firm provides comprehensive services for remodeling projects and construction sites.

== Professional affiliations ==
Laleyan was an active member of the American Institute of Architects (AIA), and served on Northern California Chapter's Board of Directors. She co-founded Organization of Women Architects in 1972, co-authored the AIA Affirmative Action Plan in 1975, and co-chaired the AIA Task Force on Women in Architecture.

== Publications ==
- Architect With a Social Conscience, Daily Pacific Builder, October 31, 1986.
- Status of Women in the Architectural Profession: Task Force Report. Washington, DC: The American Institute of Architects, 1975. Co-authored with Judith Edelman, Patricia Schiffelbein, Joan Sprague, and Jean Young. The publication is cited in The Missing 400: On The Erasure of Women From the Urban Environment.

== Legacy ==
A collection of Laleyan's architectural drawings, construction files, and photographs were donated to International Archive of Women in Architecture at Newman Library, Virginia Tech.
