= Marie-Louise Saboungi =

Condensed matter physicist

Prof Marie-Louise Saboungi
- Education: Aix-Marseille University
- Scientific career
- Fields: Condensed matter physics
- Workplaces: Sorbonne University

Marie-Louise Saboungi is a Lebanese-born American condensed matter physicist at the Institut de Minéralogie, de Physique des Matériaux et de Cosmochimie (IMPMC), Sorbonne University, Paris, France.

== Early life and education ==
Saboungi was born January 1, 1948, in Lebanon. She studied Mathematics and Physics at the Lebanese University in Beirut and obtained a Doctorat d’Etat in Physics at Aix-Marseille University, France in 1973, studying the statistical thermodynamics of molten salts.

== Career ==
After her doctorate, Saboungi joined Argonne National Laboratory and worked there as Senior Scientist until 2002. Following this she was a director at the Centre de Recherche sur la Matière Divisée, CNRS until 2011. From 2007 to 2011 she was also Program Officer at Agence Nationale de la Recherche.

In 2011 she joined IMPMC at Sorbonne University, where she currently works.

She has also been a Distinguished Professor of Physics at University of Orléans in 2002–2011, and was appointed Distinguished Visiting Professor in Soochow University in 2014.

== Research ==
Saboungi's work focuses on complex soft materials, including ionic liquids and aqueous electrolytes, with a view to applications in energy and biotechnology. She also studies silver chalcogenides, which display many fascinating phenomena including fast-ion conduction at higher temperatures, linear magnetoresistance over a broad range of magnetic fields, and topological insulator behavior.

== Awards and honours ==
- 1990 – Fellow of the American Association for the Advancement of Science
- 1991 – Award for Leadership in the Professions, YWCA of Metropolitan Chicago
- 1992 – Fellow of the American Physical Society
- 2000, 2014 – Fellow of Japan Society for the Promotion of Science
- 2007 – Fellow, Alexander von Humboldt Foundation
- 2014 – Doctor Honoris Causa, University of the Andes, Mérida, Venezuela

== Selected publications ==
- Large magnetoresistance in non-magnetic silver chalcogenides, Nature 390, 57–60 (1997), doi:10.1038/36306
- Electron distribution in water, J. Chem. Phys. 112, 9206 (2000), doi:10.1063/1.481541
- Improving reinforcement of natural rubber by networking of activated carbon nanotubes, Carbon, 46, 7, June 2008, 1037–1045, doi:10.1016/j.carbon.2008.03.011
- The Structure of Aqueous Guanidinium Chloride Solutions, J. Am. Chem. Soc. 2004, 126, 37, 11462–11470, doi:10.1021/ja040034x
