= Catherine Colomb =

Swiss novelist (1892–1965)

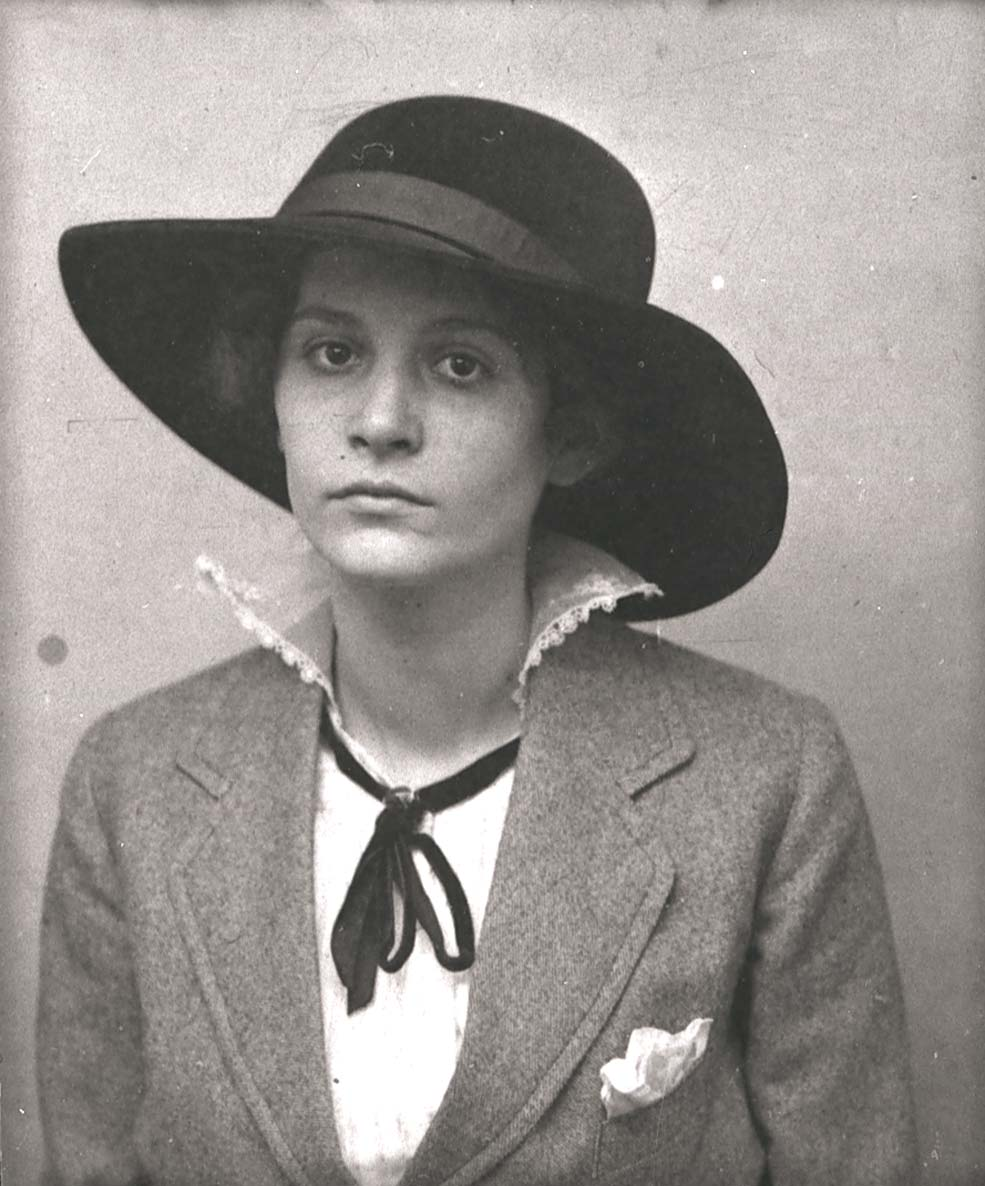

Marie-Louise Colomb (August 18, 1892 – November 3, 1965), best known by her pseudonym Catherine Colomb, was a Swiss writer, considered one of the most important 20th-century novelists in French-speaking Switzerland.

== Early life and education ==
Marie-Louise Colomb was born in 1892 in Saint-Prex, in the Swiss canton of Vaud. Her mother died in childbirth when she was 5 years old, and she was raised by her maternal grandmother. After spending her childhood in Begnins, she left to study at the University of Lausanne, where she graduated in 1916 with a degree in classical studies. She began work on a doctorate, with a thesis on Béat Louis de Muralt, but she abandoned it before the defense.

== Career ==
Colomb traveled at length to Germany, England, and Paris, before settling again in Vaud. She would spend the rest of her life in the canton—whose landscapes and social elite would inspire her novels—living in turn in Yverdon-les-Bains, Lausanne, and Prilly. She married Jean Raymond, a lawyer, in 1921, and had two sons in 1923 and 1929.

For nearly 30 years, Colomb set aside her literary ambitions to focus on the demands of family and social life. But she began to write in secret in the early 1930s, beginning the day her younger son entered school. Her first novel, Pile ou face, was published under the pseudonym Catherine Tissot in 1935.

Colomb went on to publish her three best-known novels, Château en enfance, Les Esprits de la terre, and Le temps des anges, at 10-year intervals under the pseudonym Catherine Colomb. She become a member of the Vaud Writers Association, the Society of Swiss Writers, and the Swiss Association of University Women. Her work was praised by the Swiss poet Gustave Roud and, in France, by Jean Paulhan. In 1943 she was honored by the jury of the Prix de la Guilde du Livre, and in 1956 she received the Prix du Livre Vaudois, followed by the Prix Rambert in 1962.

== Death and legacy ==
Catherine Colomb died in Prilly in 1965. Today, she is considered one of the most important and innovative writers from French-speaking Switzerland of the mid-19th century.

Her complete works were published in 1993 by Éditions L'Âge d'Homme. In 2008, the artists of Saint-Prex founded an organization called Association Catherine Colomb to promote her work and cultural events in the area.

== Selected works ==
- Pile ou face, 1934
- Châteaux en enfance, 1945; republished 1993
- Les Esprits de la terre, 1953; republished 2002
- Le Temps des anges, 1962; republished 1993

=== Posthumous ===
- La Valise, 1993
- Les Royaumes combattants, 1993
- Catherine Colomb, Œuvres complètes, 3 volumes, 1993
- Tout Catherine Colomb, 2019
