= SS Maria Luisa =

A number of ships have been named Maria Luisa, including:

- SS Maria Luisa (1902), an Italian-registered cargo ship that operated under that name from 1927 and sank in 1929
- SS Maria Luisa (1945), a Liberian-registered cargo ship that operated under that name from 1956 until 1963

== See also ==
- SS Maria Luisa R., an Italian cargo ship in service 1949–52
- Spanish ship Reina María Luisa, a Spanish Navy ship of the line
