= Louise Jordan =

American petroleum geologist

Louise Jordan (January 3, 1908 – November 22, 1966) was an American petroleum geologist. She received an honorary membership to the Oklahoma City Geological Society for her extensive subsurface research in the state of Oklahoma.

== Early life and education ==
Massachusetts Institute of Technology: The school Jordan attended when achieving her Masters and Doctorate.

Louise Jordan was born on January 3, 1908, in the city of Joplin, Missouri, to Fred A. and Anna Jordan. She attended Port Henry High School in New York, and later continued her education at Wellesley College to achieve a Bachelor of Arts degree in geology and chemistry. Jordan's interest in geology originated from her father, due to his career as a mining engineer revolving around the field of geology.

She received a master's degree in Micro-Paleontology at M.I.T. 1931. Upon completion of her master's degree, she taught physics at the American College for Girls in Istanbul, Turkey, before returning to M.I.T. in 1933 to begin work on her doctoral dissertation entitled "A Study of Miocene Foraminifera from Jamaica, the Dominican Republic, and the Republics of Panama, Costa Rica and Haiti" which she completed in 1939. During completion of her Doctorate of Philosophy, she returned to Ankara, Turkey to work as a stratigrapher and micropaleontologist for the Turkish government from 1935 to 1938. Afterwards she returned to the United States, where she worked for oil companies in Florida, Texas, and Oklahoma.

== Personal life ==
Louise Jordan was an avid gardener, cultivating a collection of rare plants. She also travelled often, whether for work or in her free time.

== Career ==
While pursuing her doctorate, Jordan taught part-time at Mount Holyoke College. Jordan later pursued stratigraphy in the petroleum field. Within her Micro-paleontology degree she looked at foraminifera which was a popular field for women during that era. During her time spent working on foraminifera, Jordan Louise alongside Esther Richard Applin published a journal called The Diagnostic foraminifera from subsurface formations in Florida. This journal contains descriptions and documents 40 different species of foraminifera found on different formations.

The upper member of the Lawson Limestone contains a little amount of fossil specimens, and those specimens are poorly preserved. Post teaching, her work took her back to Istanbul to work in the field of mineral research but later coming back to the US to work for Anzac Oil & Gas Inc. in Coleman, Texas from 1938 to 1941. In 1941 she moved between to Dallas and Amarillo in Texas and Tallahassee, Florida to work for the Sun Oil Company (now Sunoco) until 1950. From 1950 to 1951, she worked as a geological consultant for the Florida Geological Survey. In 1955, she moved to Oklahoma to work at the Oklahoma Geological Survey. Jordan served as member of various professional geological societies in editorial positions and as chairman. Most notably, in 1964, she was a founding member of the Chinar Circle, a group of 35 geologist from 23 different countries.

Jordan's work made her an integral part of the geological community on a local, national and international level, even so far as having her work on Subsurface stratigraphic names becoming a standard resource for Oklahoma geologists. Her work in the petroleum field took her to the University of Oklahoma where she resided until she died in 1966 after authoring over 80 publications in reference mainly to basic geological information for the petroleum industry in Oklahoma.

== Legacy ==
Jordan died on November 22, 1966, in Norman, Oklahoma, after a long battle with a disease. She was elected postmortem as an honorary member of the Oklahoma City Geological Society. The impression she left on her friends and family inspired Jordan's brother, Allen E. Jordan and friends to create the "Dr. Louise Jordan Memorial Fund". Allen donated a portion of Louise's estate into the fund designed to help graduate students continue their education and research in geology at the University of Oklahoma.
