= Marie-Luise Gansberg =

German literary scholar

Marie Luise Gansberg
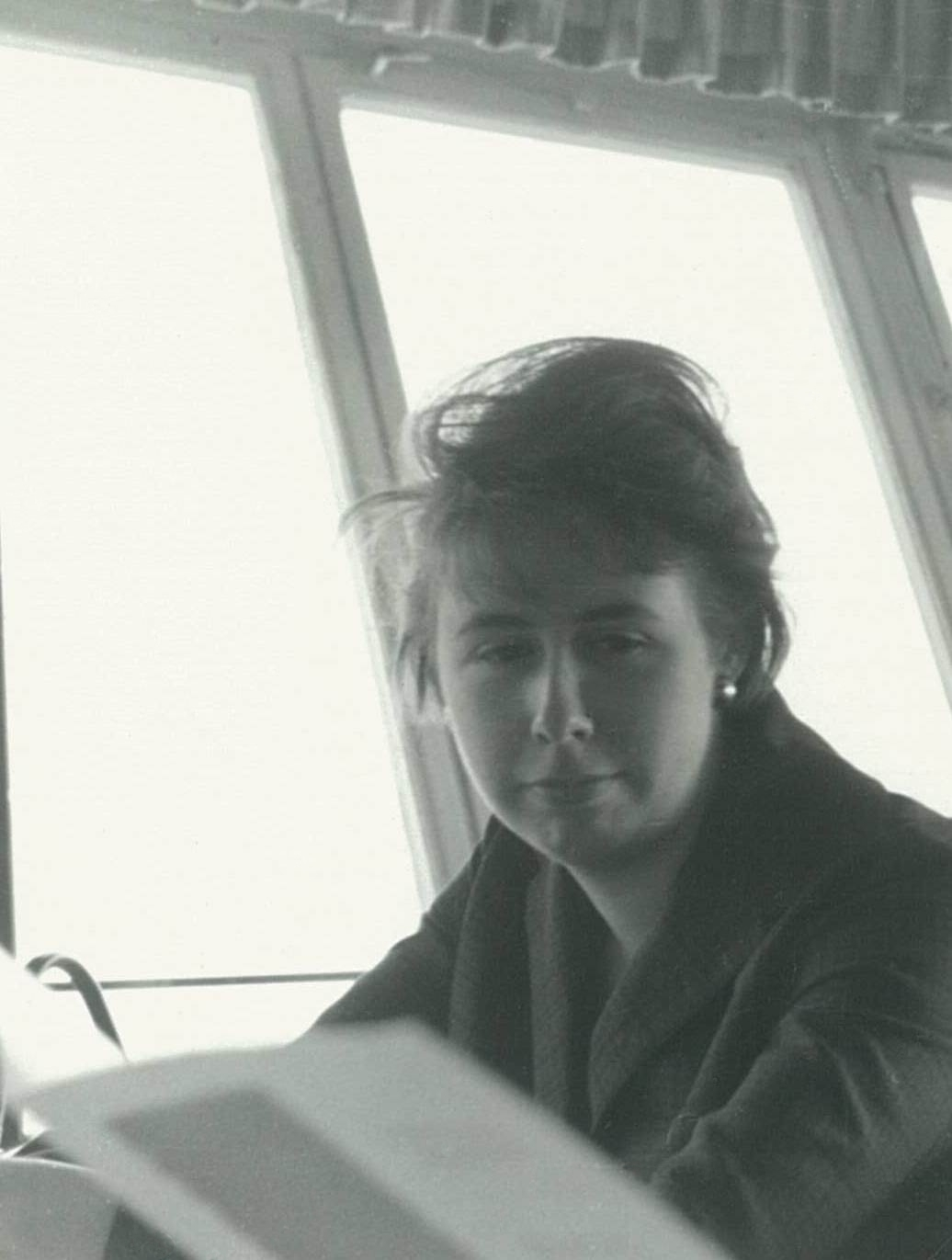
- in 1960 at the Berlin radio tower
- Born: May 4, 1933; Bremen
- Died: February 3, 2003 (aged 69); Marburg
- Occupation: Professor
- Employer: Marburg University

Marie-Luise Gansberg (4 May 1933, Bremen — 3 February 2003, Marburg) was a German literary scholar. From 1972, she was the first female professor at the Institute for Modern German Literature at Marburg University.

== Life and work ==
After a one-year commercial school education in Bremen, Gansberg studied German, English and social sciences at the University of Göttingen, the University of Hamburg, Marburg University and Heidelberg University from the summer semester of 1954. In 1962, she obtained her doctorate under Friedrich Sengle, who made her his research assistant. She began teaching at Heidelberg University in the winter semester of 1962/63. In 1965, she moved to LMU Munich in the same capacity. As a result of negative reactions, especially after the assistants' flyer campaign at the end of the winter semester 1968/69, she was transferred to Marburg University in 1970, where she was appointed Academic Councillor in 1971 and Professor in 1972 by way of transfer. Her early retirement (July 1993) is said to have been related to the high number of absences due to illness.

The first contacts between Gansberg and the Sozialistischer Deutscher Studentenbund can be traced back to the winter semester of 1964/65. In Munich, she and her colleague friend, the Germanist medievalist and Marxist Paul Gerhard Völker (1939–2011) were invited to take part in the "Sozialwissenschaftliche Reihe des SDS ★ WS 66/67": Gansberg spoke on "German Exile Literature - a Tabooed Fact", Völker on "How Reactionary is German Studies?". The three essays uniting Methodenkritik der Germanistik. Materialistische Literaturtheorie und bürgerliche Praxis, published in the "Texte Metzler" series, suddenly made the rebellious duo known to the intellectual public of the old Federal Republic.

A three-day interview marathon with Christa Reinig (1926-2008) resulted in the book Erkennen, was die Rettung ist. Christa Reinig im Gespräch mit Marie Luise Gansberg und Mechthild Beerlage (1986). The volume changed the image of the German-German writer in the scant research on Reinig that existed at the time. Gansberg was the only female professor to take part in the "3rd Siegen Colloquium on Homosexuality and Literature" (October 12–15, 1990) and gave a lecture in Zurich on April 3 of the same year on "Useless Women? 'Old maid', 'old woman', 'lesbian' in literature and what can still become of them."

On June 20, 2018, as part of the web project "1968 in German Literary Studies", Gansberg was presented to a wider audience for the first time as a woman of 1968 from the field of German studies.

In the second half of the 1970s, along with Silvia Bovenschen and Renate Möhrmann, she was one of the founders of the Feminist Literary Studies research field in German-speaking countries. She was related to the reform pedagogue Fritz Gansberg, who died in 1950.
