= María Luisa Aragón =

Guatemalan playwright, actress and radio producer

María Luisa Aragón (died February 11, 1974) was a Guatemalan playwright, actress, and radio producer.

Aragon was a native of Guatemala City; her date of birth is given in various sources as 1897, 1899, or 1910. She joined the Grupo Artístico Nacional in 1918; in 1945 she ceased stage activity and turned instead to the radio, broadcasting a program entitled Radioteatro Infantil, La voz de Guatemala. Other programs which she produced or created include Milagroso Señor de Esquipulas and El precio de una honra, both for Radio Reloj; with Armando Moreno Morales she developed El Tribunal de la Alegria and La Tremenda Corte. She also wrote numerous works for the stage; although theatrical performances were significantly curtailed under the dictatorship of Jorge Ubico, plays such as hers and those of Manuel Galich were encouraged. Continuing her acting career, Aragón toured with a variety of foreign theatrical troupes; on film she was seen in El Sombrerón and Cuando vuelvas a mí, and she appeared on television as well. She received the Quetzal de Oro from the Asociación de Periodistas de Guatemala in 1961, and she was made a member of the Order of the Quetzal by the government of Guatemala.

== Works ==
=== Plays ===
- Un loteriazo en plena crisis
- Amargo secreto
- El misterio de la cumbre
- Tempestad en el alma
- El tesoro de los pobres
- También los ricos sufren
- El testamento del compadre
- Falsa acusación
- La fuerza de la verdad
- La Cipriana
- Martín esta celoso
- Madre querida
- Amor indio
- Así es Guatemala
- ¿Por qué pecan la mujeres?
- En la zarabanda nació el amor
- Senderos de angustia
- Cadenas de un pecado
- Entre el amor y el orgullo
- En la red de su pecado
- La culpa de los padres
- Frente al destino
- Esclavo de su honra

Sources: and
