= Maria Luise =

Maria Luise may refer to:

- Maria Luise Schulten (born 1950), German educator and musicologist
- Maria Luise Thurmair (1912–2005), a German Catholic theologian and hymnwriter
- Maria Luise von Quistorp (10 June 1928 - 20 January 2025), wife of Wernher von Braun
- Maria-Luise Rainer (born 1959), an Italian luger

== See also ==
- Maria Louisa
- Maria Louise
- Maria Luisa
