= Louise Aloys Smith =

American politician (1917–1999)

Member of the Nevada Assembly
- In office 1949 – 1953

Personal details
- Born: July 19, 1917 Lovelock, Nevada, U.S.
- Died: May 12, 1999 (aged 81) Lovelock, Nevada, U.S.
- Party: Nevada Democratic Party
- Occupation: Politician

Louise Aloys Smith (July 19, 1917 – May 12, 1999) was an American politician who served two terms in the Nevada Assembly. She was elected in 1949 and re-elected in 1951. She was elected Speaker Pro Tempore of the Nevada Assembly in 1951, the first woman to hold a leadership position in that body.

She was born in Lovelock, Nevada to Dr. Eugene Kneeland Smith and Kathleen O’Sullivan Smith.

Her ancestry included Irish ethnicity. She did military service, was an operatic soprano singer, organist, politician, worked for the Sierra Pacific Power Company, and co-founded Desert Little Theater where she directed. She served on the board of the county library, and Marzan House Museum. She received the Nevada Woman of the Year designation in 1988. On April 5, 2001, the Nevada State Assembly passed a resolution honoring her.

She died in Lovelock, Nevada. The University of Nevada in Reno has a collection of her papers.
