= Louise-Marie =

Louise-Marie or Louise Marie may refer to:

== People ==
- Louise Marie de la Grange d'Arquien (1634-1728), daughter of Henri de la Grange d'Arquien and Françoise de La Châtre
- Louise Marie of the Palatinate (1647-1679), daughter of Edward, Count Palatine of Simmern and Anne Gonzaga
- Louise Marie-Thérèse (1658–1730), also known as "The Black Nun of Moret", French nun and supposed daughter of Maria Theresa of Spain
- Louise Marie Anne de Bourbon (1674–1681), illegitimate daughter of Louis XIV of France
- Princess Louisa Maria Teresa Stuart, (1682-1712), known in French as Louise Marie
- Louise Marie Madeleine Fontaine (1706–1799), French saloniste
- Louise Marie d'Orléans (1726-1728), infant French Princess
- Princess Louise Marie of France (1737-1787), Carmelite nun
- Louise Marie Thérèse Bathilde, daughter of Louis Philippe I, Duke of Orléans, wife of Louis Henri, Prince of Condé
- Louise Marie Adélaïde de Bourbon (1753-1821), daughter and heiress of Louis Jean Marie de Bourbon, duc de Penthièvre
- Louise Marie Adélaïde Eugènie d'Orléans (1777-1847), daughter of Louis Philip II, Duke of Orléans
- Louise Marie-Jeanne Hersent-Mauduit (1784–1862), French painter
- Princess Louise of France (1737-1787), prioress of Saint-Denis, last child of Louis XV and Marie Leszczyńska, whose full name Louise-Marie
- Louise-Marie d'Orléans (1812-1850), French princess, Queen of the Belgians, second wife of King Leopold I of Belgium
- Princess Louise Marie d'Artois (1819–1864), daughter of Charles Ferdinand, Duke of Berry, wife of Charles III, Duke of Parma
- Princess Louise Marie of Belgium (1858-1924), eldest daughter of King Leopold II of Belgium and Marie Henriette of Austria

== Other ==
- Belgian frigate Louise-Marie (F931)
- Louise-Marie, Belgian hamlet

== See also ==
- Marie Louise (disambiguation)
