= Luise Hartnack =

German Holocaust victim (1872–1942)

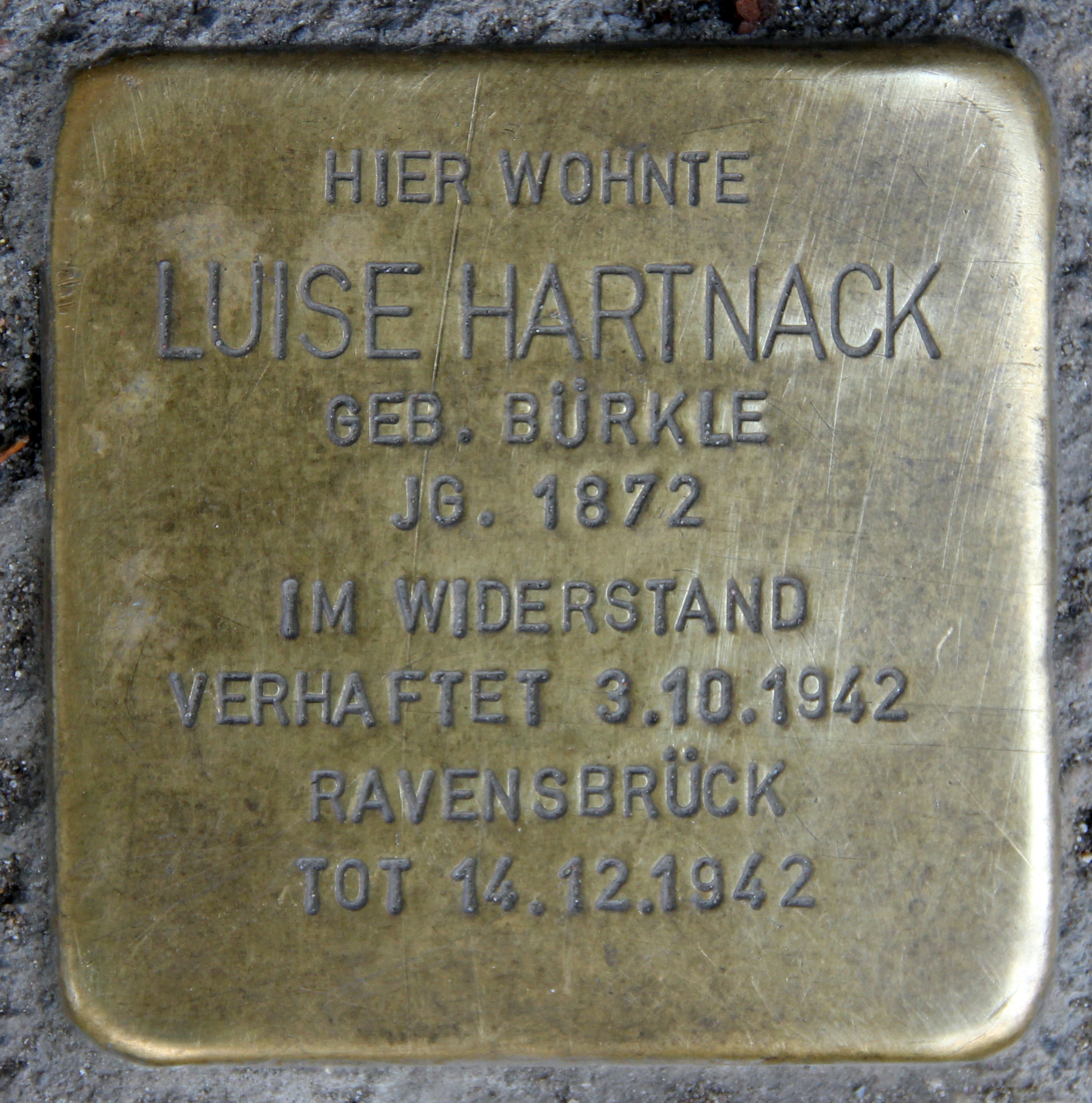
- Street stone dedicated to Holocaust victim Luise Hartnack
- Born: Luise Bürkle; 1 January 1872; Marbach am Neckar
- Died: 14 December 1942 (aged 70); Ravensbrück concentration camp
- Occupation: War resister
- Known for: Harboring a Jewish friend

Luise Hartnack (1872–1942) was a German graphologist who was murdered at Ravensbrück concentration camp. She was arrested in 1942 for hiding a Jewish friend from the German secret police, Gestapo.

== Biography ==
She was born Luise Bürkle on 1 January 1872 in Marbach am Neckar and married to the carpenter Ferdinand Hartnack.

On 2 August 1942, at the age of 70, she was arrested by the Gestapo at her home in Frankfurt am Main for providing food and a hiding place for a good Jewish friend. On 1 October 1942, she was interned in the Ravensbrück concentration camp, where she was said to have died "of heart failure" on 14 December 1942.

She is memorialized with a street stone located in Berlin on Lenaustrasse near the church Kreuzbergprojekt and near Refugio, the public building.
