= Marilu Padua =

Mexican human rights activist

- Other names: Maria de la Luz Padua
- Citizenship: Mexico
- Occupation: Human rights activist
- Organization: National Union of Domestic Workers
- Title: Secretary General

Marilu Padua (full name María de la Luz Padua), is a Mexican human rights activist and the Secretary General and Secretary for Gender and Human Rights of the National Union of Domestic Workers, an organization which aims to defend the rights of domestic workers in Mexico. Padua is responsible for the placement program at the union. She led the "Voices of defenders" campaign, which created press releases and other media to pressure governments to address the COVID-19 pandemic with human rights in mind.

== Early life ==
Padua was born a middle child. When Marilu Padua was a young girl, her mother, who was a domestic worker in Mexico City, was accused of robbery and subsequently arrested and questioned by police. Padua recounts this as a frightening and formative experience that led to her activism for the National Union of Domestic Workers. Her mother's experience set an example of encounters she wished to avoid for both herself and the 2.4 million domestic workers in her union.

== Activism ==
Padua worked as a domestic worker (child caretaker) before joining the National Union of Domestic Workers and becoming the union's secretary for Gender and Human Rights. Afterwards, she was placed in charge of the placement program. Padua then became the Secretary General of the union, directing its efforts. The union fights for better worker rights and conditions, including formalized employment contracts, social security, holidays, mandatory holiday pay, and the right to unionize. The union is led by female domestic workers, the only union in Mexico run completely by women. Padua hopes that domestic workers will no longer have to ask "what are our rights?" in the future, and instead just be hired like staff in other industries and positions.

=== COVID-19 Pandemic Activism ===
During the COVID-19 pandemic, Padua sought to draw attention to the challenges that domestic workers faced and the unfair or dangerous practices that their employers implemented. Among her concerns were the lack of personal protective equipment to protect against the chemicals used in disinfection and cleaning, a lack of job security (many lost their jobs in 2020, including both Padua and her husband), exposure to those at risk for COVID-19, a lack of paid overtime for new pandemic-related responsibilities, and the new burdens of having to take care of children who were no longer attending school in person.

Padua also advocates for the greater participation of women in decision-making roles, and promotes increased female representation in leadership positions.

== Awards ==
In 2020, Padua was recognized by the Office of the United Nations High Commissioner for Human Rights as a regional leader for her defense of human rights and in particular, her "Voices of defenders" campaign.
