= Luisa =

Luisa (Italian and Spanish) or Luísa (Portuguese) is a feminine given name; it is the feminine form of the given name Louis (Luis), the French form of the Frankish Chlodowig (German Ludwig), from the Germanic elements hlod "fame" and wig "combat".

Variations include Luisinha, Luisella, Luisana, Luisetta, Luigia, Luiza and Luisel. Its popularity derives from the cult of Saint Louise de Marillac of Paris, and from Giuseppe Verdi's opera Luisa Miller.

== People with the given name ==
=== Luisa ===
- Luisa Accati (born 1942), Italian historian, anthropologist and feminist public intellectual
- Luisa Cáceres de Arismendi (1799–1866), heroine of the Venezuelan War of Independence
- Luisa Baldini, Anglo-Italian news reporter and presenter, presently working for BBC News
- Luisa Beccaria, Italian fashion designer
- Luisa Lacal de Bracho (1874–1962), Spanish pianist, musicologist, and writer
- Luisa Bradshaw-White (born 1975), English actress
- Luisa María Calderón (born 1956), Mexican politician
- Luisa Capetillo (1879–1922), Corsican-Puerto Rican writer and anarchist
- Luisa Casati (1881–1957), Italian artists' model
- Luisa Castro (born 1966), Spanish poet and writer
- Luísa Diogo (1958–2026), Mozambican politician, Prime Minister of Mozambique (2004–2010)
- Luisa DiPietro, faculty member at the University of Illinois at Chicago College of Dentistry
- Luisa Durán (born 1941), former First Lady of Chile, the wife of Chile Ricardo Lagos
- Luisa "Loi" Ejercito Estrada (born 1930), Filipino politician
- Luisa Ferida (1914–1945), Italian stage and motion picture actress
- Luisa Garmendia (1797–1857), Argentine-Chilean First Lady of Chile
- Luisa Görlich (born 1998), German ski jumper
- Luisa Grube (born 2001), German paraclimber
- Luisa Lambertini (born 1963), Italian economist specializing in monetary and fiscal policies
- Luisa Martín (born 1960), Spanish actress
- Luisa Martín Rojo (born 1961), Spanish linguist
- Luisa of Medina-Sidonia (1613–1666), Queen of Portugal
- Luisa Menárguez, Spanish harpist and educator
- Luisa Micheletti (born 1983), presenter on MTV Brazil
- Luisa Moreno (1907–1992), Guatemalan-American communist and writer
- Luisa Morgantini (born 1940), Italian politician, Member of the European Parliament
- Luisa Eugenia Navas (1920-2020), Chilean pharmacist and botanist
- Luisa Ottolini (born 1954), Italian physicist
- Luisa Ranieri (born 1973), Italian actress
- Luisa Rivelli (1931–2013), Italian film actress
- Luisa Roldán (1652–1706), Spanish sculptor of the Baroque Era
- Luisa Rossi (1925–1984), Italian actress
- Luisa Sala (1923–1986), Spanish actress
- Luisa Sanz Martínez (born 1970), Spanish politician
- Luisa Spagnoli (1877–1935), Italian entrepreneur
- Luisa Stefani (born 1997) Brazilian professional tennis player
- Luisa Teresa Pacheco (died 2023), Venezuelan politician
- Luisa Tetrazzini (1871–1940), Italian coloratura soprano
- Luisa Toledo (1939–2021), Chilean human rights activist
- Luisa Torsi (born 1964), Italian chemist
- Luisa Värk (born 1987), Estonian singer
- Luisa Welcke (born 2002), German ice hockey player
- Luisa Wilson (born 2005), Mexican-Canadian ice hockey player
- Luisa Zissman (born 1987), British television personality

=== Luisel ===
- Luisel Ramos (1984–2006), Uruguayan model

=== Luisana ===
- Luisana Lopilato (born 1987), Argentine actress and model
- Luisana Melo, Venezuelan politician
- Luisana Pérez (journalist), Venezuelan-American communications expert and political advisor
- Luisana Pérez (table tennis), Venezuelan table tennis player

== Fictional characters with the name ==
- Luisa Alver, a fictional character played by Yara Martinez in the series Jane the Virgin
- Luisa Anselmi, a fictional character played by Anouk Aimée in the 1962 film 8½
- Luisa Contini, a fictional character played by Marion Cotillard in the 2009 film Nine
- Luisa "Adelita" Espina, a fictional character played by Carla Baratta in the series Mayans MC
- Luisa Madrigal, a fictional character played by Jessica Darrow in the 2021 Disney film Encanto
- Luisana Maza, a fictional character played by Luisana Lopilato in the television series Chiquititas

== Other uses ==
- Luisa Miller is an opera by Giuseppe Verdi
- Luisa World, a Greek fashion company
- Luisa was Giovanni da Verrazzano's name for Block Island
- Luisa Piccarreta also known as "Little Daughter of the Divine Will" is a proposed Roman Catholic saint
- "Luísa" is a song composed by Tom Jobim Antônio Carlos Jobim

== See also ==
- Louisa Dunne (1892–1967), English murder victim
