= Luisa World =

Greek fashion company

- Industry: Fashion
- Founded: 1975
- Founder: Zafeiris Tsourekas & Tsourekas family
- Headquarters: Athens, Greece
- Area served: Greece
- Products: Clothing
- Website: www.luisaworld.com

Luisa World is a Greek luxury fashion company headquartered in Athens, Greece. Luisa World has boutique stores in Kolonaki, Athens and also other locations such as Mykonos and Santorini.

== History ==
Luisa World was established as Rossi S.A. in 1975 by Zafeiris Tsourekas in Athens, Greece. Its flagship store is located in Kolonaki, Athens. Afterwards, additional branches were opened in Vouliagmeni (at the Four Seasons Astir Palace Hotel), Kifisia, and Mykonos, with more recent branches opened in Santorini and Naousa, Paros.

ΛΟΥΙΖΑ by Luisa World is an initiative launched by Luisa World in 2023 that focuses on Greek designers and artisans. The initiative promotes artisanal techniques for Greek design and organizes curated exhibitions on Greek islands, as well as online.

== Overview ==
Luisa World offers clothing and shoes for both men and women. It also carries accessories such as handbags, sunglasses, and others.

Luisa World's boutique stores carry items from Yves Saint Laurent, Celine, Bottega Veneta, Valentino Garavani, Fendi, Loewe, Jacquemus, Balmain, Gucci, Alaïa, Chloé, among others. The full list of brands is as follows.

| Brand | Women | Men | Notes |
|---|---|---|---|
| Alaïa | Yes | | includes eyewear |
| Alesandra Rich | Yes | | |
| Alexander McQueen | Yes | Yes | |
| Ami Paris | Yes | Yes | |
| Amina Muaddi | Yes | | |
| Amphora | Yes | | |
| Aya Muse | Yes | | |
| Balmain | Yes | Yes | |
| Birkenstock 1774 | Yes | Yes | |
| Bottega Veneta | Yes | Yes | includes eyewear |
| Brioni | | Yes | |
| Burberry | Yes | Yes | |
| Celine | Yes | Yes | includes eyewear |
| Chloé | Yes | | includes eyewear |
| Christopher Esber | Yes | | |
| Courréges | Yes | | |
| David Koma | Yes | | |
| Dior | | Yes | |
| Dolce & Gabbana | Yes | Yes | |
| Etro | Yes | Yes | |
| Fendi | Yes | Yes | |
| Gabriela Hearst | Yes | | |
| Gianvito Rossi | Yes | | |
| Givenchy | Yes | Yes | |
| Gucci | Yes | Yes | includes eyewear |
| Helios | Yes | | |
| Helmut Lang | Yes | Yes | |
| Isabel Marant | Yes | | |
| Jacquemus | Yes | | |
| Jimmy Choo | Yes | | |
| Johanna Ortiz | Yes | | |
| La Double J | Yes | | |
| Lefka | Yes | | |
| Loewe | Yes | Yes | |
| Loulou Studio | Yes | | |
| Marant | | Yes | |
| Marant Etoile | Yes | | |
| Missoni | Yes | Yes | |
| Missoni Mare | Yes | | |
| Miu Miu | Yes | | |
| Moeva | Yes | | |
| Moncler | Yes | Yes | |
| Moncler Genius | | Yes | |
| Moncler Grenoble | Yes | Yes | |
| Monies | Yes | | |
| Nevro | Yes | | |
| New Balance | Yes | Yes | |
| Oséree | Yes | | |
| Pucci | Yes | | |
| Rabanne | Yes | | |
| Reina Olga | Yes | | |
| Rene Caovilla | Yes | | |
| Repetto | Yes | | |
| Stella McCartney | Yes | | |
| Stone Island | | Yes | |
| Theory | Yes | | |
| Tom Ford | Yes | | |
| Toteme | Yes | | |
| Valentino Garavani | | Yes | |
| Versace | | Yes | |
| Yves Saint Laurent | Yes | Yes | includes eyewear |
| Zegna | | Yes | |
