= Marilú Rojas Salazar =

Mexican Catholic theologian, scholar and feminist

Marilú Rojas Salazar is a Mexican researcher and Catholic theologian, noted for her feminist activism, research in gender studies and position in favor of reforming the Catholic Church to recognize "the right to citizenship" of women in the church, including leadership positions and ordinations. She is a missionary nun of Santa Teresa de Lisieux and holds both a masters and a PhD in systematic theology from the Catholic University of Leuven. She has taught at many universities throughout Mexico, but is currently a professor of theology at the Universidad Iberoamericana Puebla and Interreligious Institute of Mexico. She is a member of the Spanish Association of Theologians (ATE), the European Association of Women for Theological Research (ESWTR) and the Association of Itinerant Theologians which was recently established in Mexico. Her research centers on feminist theology from the prospect of ecofeminist theology of Latin America. She believes that the Vatican must rethink issues such as human rights and participation of women in the Church and criticizes the papacy, but not the pope. In Rojas' explanation, the system, not the individual popes, promote "structures [which are] sexist, macho, patriarchal, class conscious, hierarchical and homophobic". Her brand of feminism does not exclude men, calling instead for a change in the relationships of equality which creates a new, system of benefits for both women and men in the social structure including changes in ecclesial, economic and political benefits. It also embraces multiculturalism, recognizing that in Latin America oppression of people has caused marginalization and continues to be based on relations of inequality, domination and exclusion.
