= Marie-Louise Charles =

French businesswoman (1765 – c. 1807)

Marie-Louise Charles (1765, Petit-Bourg – after 1807) was a freed African slave born in Guadeloupe around 1765 and living in Bordeaux, France at the end of the 18th century as a businesswoman.

== Biography ==
Marie-Louise Charles was born as a slave in Guadeloupe around 1765 in the village of Petit-Bourg. Her parents, Charles and Marie, were in all likelihood two slaves.

When she appears in Bordeaux, France, she is a free woman of about 20 years of age. In the summer of 1784, Marie-Louise bought a "start of a building" a few hundred meters from the Saint-Seurin Basilica. This part of Bordeaux was outside the city walls and preferred by the Black community. She bought the house for the sum of 4,000 livres, a colossal sum for a newly freed slave. The transaction was about three times higher than the average buying price at that time. The deed of sale says Bernardin Brunelot, a Bordeaux man originally from Santo Domingo, stood surety, accepting financial responsibility. She expanded the house and sold it three years later to Casimir Fidèle for twice the purchase price.

Through financial deals and the rental of her property, she acquired a fortune and was able to live in luxury. In 1790, she married the mixed race hairdresser François Hardy. According to Duprat:

"During this marriage, it was she who provided the greater part of the pooled assets: while François only brought 200 livres, Marie-Louise presented herself with a debt of 3,000 livres owed by Mr. Fidèle as well as furniture estimated at more than 1,400 livres. She owned a complete bed and a walnut wardrobe, two imposing pieces of furniture that were real investments under the Ancien Régime."

Her life has been the subject of research and is considered to be remarkable for a former slave in the 18th century. While there was a large enclave of people of African descent and former slaves in Bordeaux, only a minority of them became rich, and most of those were male. She was last noted in the Napoleonic census of 1807, when she stated that she was a seamstress and was apparently no longer wealthy.
