= Marie-Louise Sibazuri =

Burundian women's rights activist and teacher

- Born: 2 January 1960 (age 66); Kayanza Province, Burundi
- Occupations: Activist, teacher, writer
- Spouse: Hilaire Bucumi

Marie-Louise Sibazuri (born 2 January 1960) is a Burundian women's rights activist and teacher who has devoted her time to writing since 1993. In addition to becoming a prolific playwright, she is widely known as the author of the popular radio series Umumbanyi Niwe Muryango (Our Neighbours Are Our Family), a soap opera which sets out to improve relations between Tutsis and Hutus following the conflicts of the mid-1990s. After spending several years in Belgium where she was active in the theatre, she has now moved to Australia with her second husband, Hilaire Bucumi. She is currently writing collections of Burundian folk tales.

== Early life ==
Born on 2 January 1960 in the Kayanza Province of northern Burundi, Marie-Louise Sibazuri completed her school education at a Catholic secondary school. While there, after taking the part of Sganarelle in Molière one act play, she was inspired her to write a play herself when only 14. She went on to qualify as a teacher and then a librarian.

== Career ==
In the 1980s, she campaigned for women's rights becoming deputy secretary general of the Union des Femmes Burundaises. This brought her into close contact with the government of Pierre Buyoya, who appointed her a member of the commission on national unity in 1988.

In parallel, Sibazuri became a prolific playwright, publishing some 70 plays, either in French or in her native Kirundi. From 1976, they were performed in Burundi, thanks in part to her own troupe which was open to both Tutsis and Hutus. Her plays addressed important topics of the times such as the civil war, the AIDS crisis and violence again women. In 1993 she gave up teaching to devote her life to writing.

In the mid-1990s, a representative of the American Search for Common Ground organization persuaded her to contribute to reducing conflicts between the Tutsis and Hutus by writing a weekly soap opera for radio. Launched in March 1997 and broadcast on national radio, Umumbanyi Niwe Muryango was an immediate success attracting millions throughout the country every Friday evening week after week.

The series tells the story of two neighbouring families who establish strong connections. In Sibazuri's own words: "One of the families is Hutu, the other Tutsi, but you don't know which is which. I wanted to demystify the ethnic background. I bring up political manipulation, corruption, AIDS, religion, day-to-day life, peace, and justice." The series ran to more than 840 episodes until September 2010 when Belgian funding ran out in the absence of an elected government.

The Sibazuri family home was burnt down and her husband was brutally attacked by political opponents. The following year, the couple decided to move to Belgium with their children. There she divided her time between her theatrical interests and furthering her studies at the Université Catholique de Louvain. In the early 2000s, the United Nations Development Programme suggested she should write another radio series, this time on the Rwandans and Burundians in the Tanzanian refugee camps. Sibazuri travelled to the camps, encouraging the refugees to take part in the recordings themselves. The series ended up with more than 300 episodes. In this connection, Sibazuri commented: "The writer is the voice of the people, as they have no voice themselves... We have to keep on fighting injustice and giving support to peace—and that's the job of writers."

In 2013, she published her first novel Les seins nus and the following year she was appointed ambassador for Francophonie, i.e. in support of the French language.

After spending several years in Belgium where she was active in the theatre, she has now moved to Australia with her second husband, Hilaire Bucumi. In 2019, she published La Femme sur le sentier des interdits, a collection of Burundian folk tales.
