= Maria Luise Schulten =

German educator and musicologist (born 1950)

Maria Luise Schulten (born 17 December 1950) is a music educator, musicologist and teacher.

== Life and career ==
Born in Oeding (now Südlohn-Oeding) in the western region of Münster, Schulten passed the First Staatsexamen for the teaching profession at primary and secondary schools at the University of Cologne in 1973 and received her doctorate there in 1978 with an empirical study of the professional profile of music teachers under Helga de la Motte-Haber. She worked at various schools as a music and piano teacher and as a research assistant and lecturer for music psychology and music theory at the Universities of Cologne and Wuppertal.

In 1980, Schulten became a research assistant to Günther Noll at the universities of Düsseldorf and Cologne and habilitated in 1988 with the empirical thesis "Musikpräferenz und Musikpädagogik. Ein Beitrag zur musikpädagogischen Grundlagenforschung". She then worked as a university lecturer in music education at the Justus Liebig University of Giessen from 1988 to 1993 and as a professor of music education at the University of Münster from 1993 to 2000. In 2000, she became a professor of music education at the University of Siegen. Her research focuses on empirical classroom research, music psychological and sociological aspects of teaching and evaluation research in music education. Schulten became emeritus professor in 2014.

Schulten was a member of various specialist groups for music education at federal and state level as well as at the German Society for Music Psychology. She is currently a member of the scientific advisory board of the Federal Ministry of Education and Research research programme on Jedem Kind ein Instrument (Every Child an Instrument). This music education programme, in whose scientific support Schulten was significantly involved from the beginning, was first installed in the Ruhr region in the school year 2007/08. In the future, not only instrumental lessons will be possible, but every child will be offered instruments, dancing, singing (JeKits). In the meantime, the programme also exists or is being planned in several other federal States. Schulten is also a member of the Foundation's Board of Trustees "Jedem Kind ein Instrument".

== Publications ==
- Das Berufsbild des Musiklehrers (Beiträge zur systematischen Musikwissenschaft), Gelnhausen 1979
- Musikpräferenz und Musikpädagogik. Ein Beitrag zur musikpädagogischen Grundlagenforschung. Frankfurt, 1990
- Die Fragestellungen wechseln, die Methode bleibt. Zur Biographie des Semantischen Differentials in der Musikpädagogik. In Vogt, Jürgen, Rolle, Christian & Heß, Frauke: Musikpädagogik und Heterogenität. Münster 2012, pp. 113–123
- together with Lothwesen, Kai Stefan: Musikpädagogik und Systematische Musikwissenschaft. Beziehungen der Disziplinen aus fach- und forschungshistorischer Perspektive. In Schläbitz, Norbert (ed.): Interdisziplinarität als Herausforderung musik-pädagogischer Forschung (Wissenschaftlichen Beirates des Bundesministerium für Bildung und Forschung Forschungsprogramms zu "Jedem Kind ein Instrument" Musikpädagogische Forschung vol. 30). Essen 2009, pp. 13–30

Publisher:

- Medien und Musik. Musikalische Sozialisationen 5 – 15jähriger Vol. 1, Münster 1999
- Reihe: Musikvermittlung in Theorie und Praxis. LiT Verlag, Münster
