= Marie Louise Marguerite Belèze =

French botanist (1851-1913)

- Born: 1851
- Died: 1913 (aged 61–62)
- Occupations: botanist, taxonomist, and explorer

Marie Louise Marguerite Belèze (1851-1913), also credited as Marguerite Belèze, was a French botanist, taxonomist, and explorer. She collected extensive botanical collections, and is known for her work on the cryptogamic flora surrounding Paris. Some of her plant collections are held at the University of Strasbourg's Herbarium

== Written works ==
- Marie Louise Marguerite Belèze. 1898. Liste des plantes rares ou intéressantes, phanérogames, cryptogames vasculaires et characées, des environs de Montfort-l'Amaury et de la forêt de Rambouillet, Seine-et-Oise. Bull. of the Société botanique de France, 42.
