= Marie Louise Lefort =

American physician (1874–1951)

Marie Louise Lefort (September 1874 – August 7, 1951) was an American physician who directed a medical unit in France during World War I. From 1898 to 1902, Marie Louise Lefort was the first female district physician in Newark, New Jersey.

== Early life and career ==
Lefort was born in September 23, 1874 to French parents, Henry and Adaline Lefort. Her father, Henry, was a watch manufacturer in Newark. In her twenties, she lived with her mother, Adeline Lefort, and a servant, Edward Muster. A graduate from the New York Infirmary for Women and children, he conducted her medical practice in New Jersey until 1918, when she aided World War I efforts by creating the first hospital unit for gassed soldiers in Reims, France. In 1919, she became Director of the American Memorial Hospital for the American Fund for the French Wounded. Speaking both English and French fluently allowed her to communicate easily with the Americans and the French while working abroad. Under the direction of Lefort, a medical gas unit reformed a damaged girls' boarding school into Jeanne d'Arc Hospital.
