= María Luisa Arencibia =

Venezuelan Composer, Organist and Teacher

María Luisa Arencibia (born September 3, 1959) is a Venezuelan composer, organist, and teacher.

== Biography ==
Born in Canarias, Arencibia studied at the Escuela de Música Juan Manuel Olivares and Escuela Superior de Música José Ángel Lamas graduating as a composer in 1990. Her instructors also included José Luis Arreaza, José Peñín and Humberto Sagredo. She has served as maestra de capilla at the El Valle church, and has taught music at various schools around Caracas. Her musical output includes a number of chamber compositions as well as works for orchestra and choir.
