= Maria Luisa Gorno-Tempini =

Italian behavioral neurologist

- Born: Brescia
- Occupations: Neurologist, Neuroscientist

Maria Luisa Gorno-Tempini is a behavioral neurologist and neuroscientist and a leading expert in frontotemporal dementia. She directs the ALBA Lab of the University of California, San Francisco Memory and Aging Center. She is also the co-director of the UCSF Dyslexia Center.

== Biography ==
Gorno-Tempini obtained her medical degree (University of Brescia, 1993) and clinical specialization in neurology (University of Modena and Reggio Emilia, 1998) in Italy. To pursue her research interest, she worked for three years at the Functional Imaging Laboratory, University College London, where she obtained her Ph.D. degree (2001). As member of the language group, she conducted positron emission tomography and functional MRI studies investigating the neural basis of face and proper name processing. In 2001, Gorno-Tempini began her work at the Memory and Aging Center as a clinical fellow. She has since become a full professor.

== Clinical and research areas ==
Gorno-Tempini’s main focus is in behavioral neurology, particularly the neural substrate of language and memory. She deploys behavioral and neuroimaging paradigms to the study of neurodegenerative disease, in particular primary progressive aphasia and frontotemporal dementia.

In 2011 Gorno-Tempini led an international team that classified primary progressive aphasia (PPA) into three distinct types—semantic, nonfluent, and logopenic—based on symptoms, brain regions affected, and the protein type most likely to cause degeneration (tau, TDP-43, or amyloid). Each type of PPA resulted from damage to different parts of the brain by malfunctioning proteins. Her current work focuses on Dyslexia.

Gorno-Tempini has had mentees from diverse backgrounds (e.g., residents, pre-doctoral and post-doctoral fellows, and faculty-level individuals) and has taught them clinical neurology, basic neuroscience, research methodology, manuscript preparation and grant writing. She advocates for international scientific collaboration.
