= Marie Louise Amiet =

French painter and illustrator (1879 – 1944)

- Born: April 17, 1879; Molsheim, Alsace-Lorraine, German Empire
- Died: 1944 (aged 64–65)

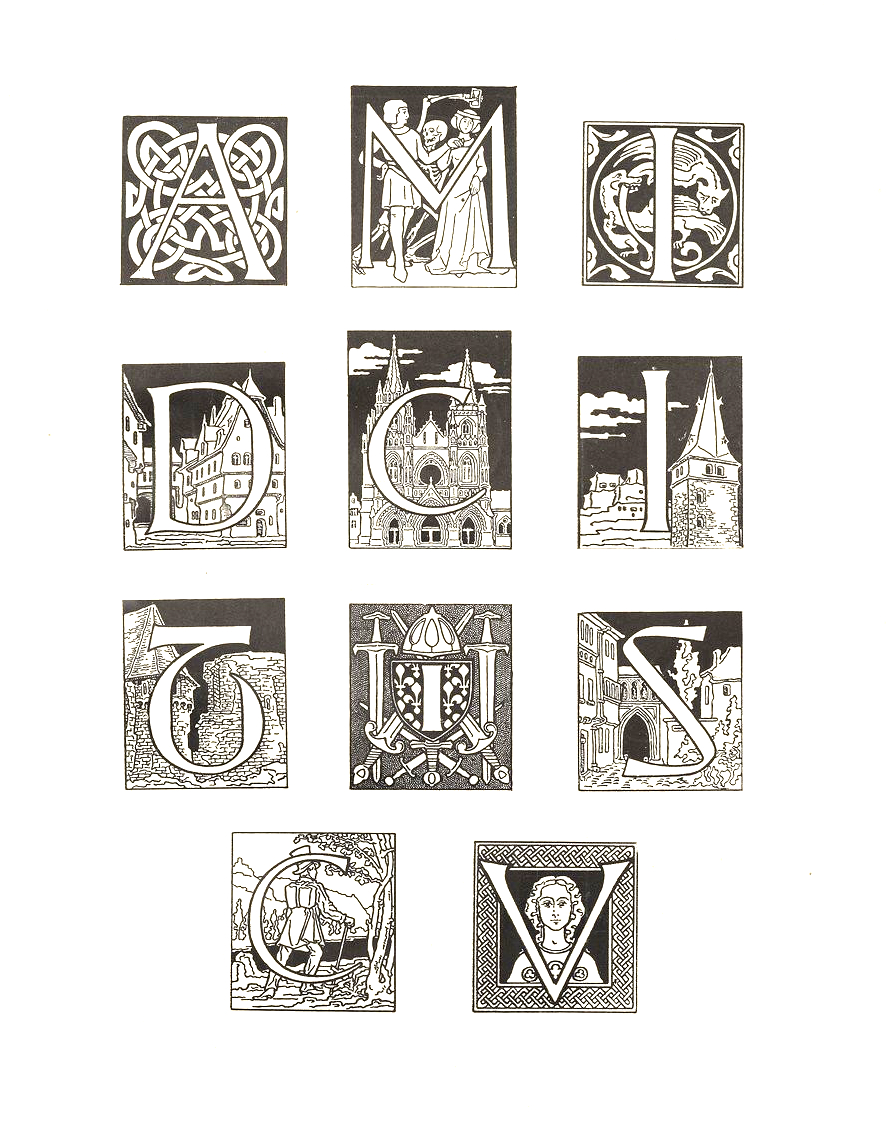
Illustrations by Marie Louise Amiet for Victor Hugo's Le Rhin.

Marie Louise Amiet (April 17, 1879–1944) was a French painter and illustrator.

== Biography ==
Amiet was a student of the illustrator and engraver Josef Kaspar Sattler. A member of the Society of Alsation Artists, around 1912 she illustrated Le Rhin by Victor Hugo.

== Collections ==
- Musée de la Chartreuse de Molsheim
- Musée du Louvre département des Arts graphiques
- Musée d'Art moderne et contemporain (Strasbourg)

== Publications ==
- La Condamnation de Jeanne d'Arc vue à la lumière des grands événements du Moyen Âge, Nouvelles éditions du siècle, 1934
