= Louisa =

Louisa may refer to:

== Places ==
Australia

- Louisa Island (Tasmania)

Canada

- Louisa or Lac-Louisa, a community in Wentworth, Quebec

Malaysia

- Louisa Reef, Sabah

United States

- Louisa, Kentucky
- Louisa, Missouri
- Louisa, Virginia
- Louisa County, Iowa
- Louisa County, Virginia

Belgium

- Louisa - Square in Brussels and metro station, next to Palace de Justice, see Avenue Louise

== Other ==
- HMS Louisa, the name of four ships of the Royal Navy
- Louisa (ship), United States ship of the 1800s
- Louisa (film), 1950 film starring Ronald Reagan

== People with the given name ==
- Louisa of Great Britain (1749–1768)
- Louisa, Countess of Craven, originally Louisa Brunton (1785?–1860), English actress
- Louisa Adams (1775–1852), First Lady of the United States from 1825 to 1829
- Louisa May Alcott (1832–1888), American novelist, short story writer and poet
- Louisa Rose Allen, English singer and songwriter known as Foxes
- Louisa Ardill (1853-1920), British-born Australian temperance leader, suffragist, and city missionary
- Louisa Beaufort (1781–1863), Irish antiquarian, author and artist
- Louisa Dow Benton (1831–1895), American linguist and letter writer
- Louisa Bertman, Jewish American illustrator, animator, visual narrative artist specializing in social and political advocacy
- Louisa Briggs (1818 or 1836- 1925), Aboriginal Australian rights activist, dormitory matron, midwife and nurse
- Louisa Burns (c.1869–1958), American osteopathic physician
- Louisa Cavendish, Duchess of Devonshire
- Louisa Cavendish-Bentinck (1832–1918)
- Louisa Chafee (born 1991), American competitive sailor
- Louisa Chirico (born 1996), American tennis player
- Louisa Clein (born 1979), English actress
- Lady Louisa Conolly (1743–1821), Irish noblewoman
- Louisa Knapp Curtis (1851–1910), Columnist and first editor of the Ladies Home Journal
- Louisa Emily Dobrée (fl. ca. 1877–1917), French writer
- Louisa Lane Drew (1820–1897), English-born American actress
- Louisa Durrell (1886–1964)
- Louisa Entwistle (born 1887), English suffragette
- Louisa Frederici (1844–1921)
- Louisa Morton Greene, American social reformer
- Louisa Gould, Jewish activist
- Louisa Jane Hall (1802–1892), American poet, essayist, literary critic
- Louisa Hanoune (born 1954), Algerian politician
- Louisa Harland, Irish actress
- Louisa Horton (1920–2008), American film, television, and stage actress
- Louisa Jacobson (born 1991), American actress
- Louisa Vesterager Jespersen (died 2018), Danish female murder victim
- Louisa Johnson, English singer
- Louisa Krause (born 1986), American film, stage, and television actress
- Louisa Lawson (1848–1920), Australian poet, writer, publisher, suffragist, and feminist
- Louisa Lytton (born 1989), English actress
- Louisa Frederica Adela Schafer (b. 1865), English Esperantist, singer, translator and teacher
- Louisa Susannah Cheves McCord (1810–1879), American writer
- Louisa Moritz (1936–2019), Cuban-American actress and lawyer
- Louisa Starr (1845–25 May 1909), British painter
- Louisa Stone Stevenson (1879–1969), American chemistry professor
- Louisa Maria Stuart (1692–1712), Princess Royal
- Louisa Swain (1801–1880)
- Louisa Thomas (born 1981), American writer and sports journalist
- Louisa Caroline Huggins Tuthill (1799–1879), American children's book author
- Louisa Wilkinson (1889–1968), British military nurse and nursing administrator
- Louisa Wisseling, former member of Australian folk-influenced pop quartet The Seekers
- Louisa Young, British writer

=== Fictional characters ===
- Louisa Clarke, main character in Me Before You and its film adaptation
- Louisa Musgrove, character in Jane Austen's novel Persuasion
- Louisa, the pen name of the eighteenth century English writer Elizabeth Boyd (1710–1745)
- Louisa, a character in the American-Canadian animated series Work It Out Wombats!
- Louisa Loops, a character in the American-Canadian animated series Lyla in the Loop
- Louisa von Trapp, third daughter in the Von Trapp family in The Sound of Music

== See also ==
- Louis (disambiguation)
- Louise (disambiguation)
- Luisa (disambiguation)
