= Mary Lou (name) =

Mary Lou, Mary-Lou, Marylou or Marilou is a feminine given name. It is a combination of the names Mary and Lou.

Notable people and fictional characters with this name include:

== People ==
=== Arts and entertainment ===
- Marilou (singer) (Marilou Bourdon, born 1990), French-Canadian pop singer and cookbook author
- Marilou Awiakta (born 1936), American poet
- Mary Lou Belli (fl. 1984–present), American television director and author
- Marilou Berry (born 1983), French actress, film director and screenwriter
- Marylou Dawes (1933–2013), Canadian concert pianist
- Marilou Diaz-Abaya (1955–2012), Filipino film director
- Mary Lou Fallis (born 1948), Canadian opera singer
- Mary Lou Farrell (1942–2011), Canadian singer, actress and beauty queen
- Mary Lou Kolbenschlag (born 1992), American actress - see Mary Lou (actress)
- Mary Lou Lord (born 1965), American indie folk musician and busker
- Marylou Mainiel (born 1993), French musician - see Oklou
- Mary Lou Metzger (born 1950), American singer and dancer
- Mary Lou Turner (born 1947), American country music singer
- Mary Lou Williams (1910–1981), American jazz pianist, arranger and composer

=== Journalism ===
- Mary Lou Finlay (born 1947), Canadian radio and television journalist
- Mary Lou Forbes (1926–2009), American Pulitzer Prize-winning journalist and commentator
- Mary Lou Foy (born 1944), American photojournalist

=== Politics ===
- Marilou Arroyo-Lesaca, Filipino politician
- Mary Lou Baker (1914–1965), American member of the Florida House of Representatives, and women's rights activist
- Mary Lou Dickerson (born 1946), American politician, Democratic member of the Washington House of Representatives
- Mary Lou Freeman (1941–2006), American politician, Republican member of the Iowa House of Representatives
- Mary Lou Goertzen (1929–2020), American artist, peace activist and Mennonite
- Mary Lou Makepeace (born 1940), American politician, Mayor of Colorado Springs
- Mary Lou McDonald (born 1969), Irish politician, leader of Sinn Féin
- Mary Lou Rath (fl. 1978–present), American politician, Republican member of New York State Senate

=== Science and medicine ===
- Mary Lou Clements-Mann (1946–1998), American biologist
- Mary L. McMaster, American oncologist and clinical trialist
- Mary Lou Soffa, American computer scientist
- Mary Lou Zoback (born 1952), American geophysicist

=== Sport ===
- Mary Lou Beschorner (1929–2008), American player in the All-American Girls Professional Baseball League
- Mary Lou Crocker (1944–2016), American golfer
- Mary-Lou Daniels (born 1961), American retired tennis player
- Marilou Dozois-Prévost (born 1986), Canadian weightlifter
- Mary Lou Graham (born 1936), American player in the All-American Girls Professional Baseball League
- Mary Lou Petty (1915–2014), American swimmer
- Mary Lou Retton (born 1968), American retired gymnast, 1984 Olympic all-around champion
- Mary Lou Studnicka (1931–2014), American pitcher in the All-American Girls Professional Baseball League

=== Other fields ===
- Mary Lou Jepsen (born 1965), American entrepreneur, business executive and inventor
- Mary Lou Robinson (1926–2019), American federal judge
- Mary Lou Spiess (1931–1992), American disability advocate, teacher, and designer of disabled fashion
- Mary Louise Marylou Whitney (1925–2019), American philanthropist and socialite

== Fictional characters ==
- Mary Lou Collins, in The Larry Sanders Show
- Marylou, a character in the novel On the Road by American writer Jack Kerouac
- Marylou Ahearn, a character in the novel The Revenge of the Radioactive Lady by Elizabeth Stuckey-French
- Marylou, a character in the movie The Howling (film) played by Elizabeth Shé
