= Marie Louise (disambiguation) =

Marie Louise or Marie-Louise is a French feminine compound given name.

It may also refer to:

- Marie-Louise (conscript), a type of conscript in the last years of the Napoleonic Wars
- Marie-Louise (film), a 1944 Swiss film
- Marie Louise Diadem, a turquoise and diamond diadem owned by the Smithsonian Institution
- Marie Louise Island, Amirante Islands, Seychelles
- Marie Louise v. Marot, a Louisiana court case on slavery
- Joseph-Guillaume Barthe (1816–1893), Canadian writer who used the pseudonym 'Marie Louise'

== See also ==
- Louise-Marie
- Maria Luisa
- Maria Luiza (disambiguation)
- Mary Louise (disambiguation)
