= Lewis (given name) =

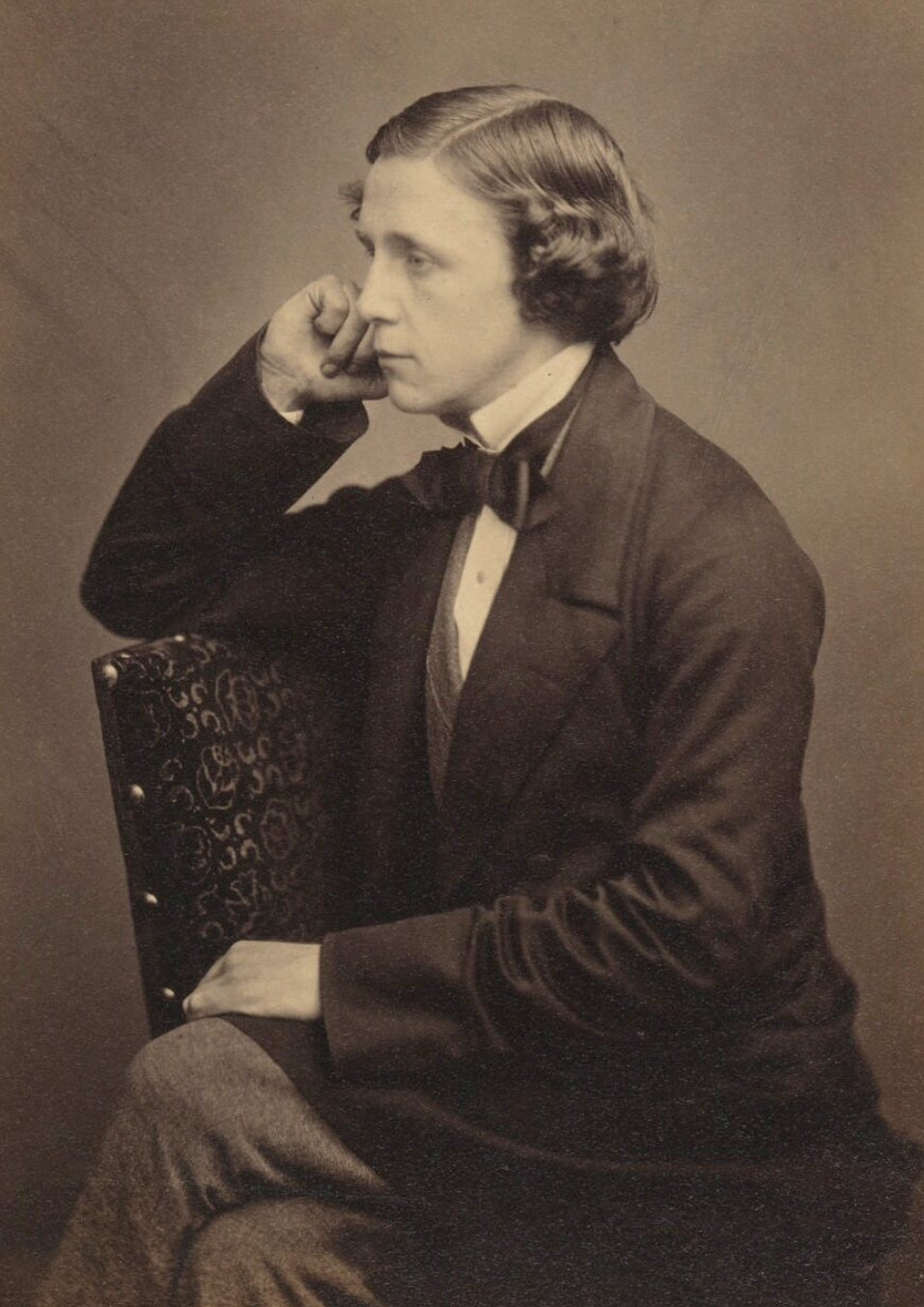
- Lewis Carroll in 1857
- Pronunciation: /ˈluːɪs/
- Gender: Male

Other names
- Related names: Louis, Lou, Lew

Lewis (/ˈluːɪs/) is a masculine English-language given name. It was coined as an anglicisation of given names in other languages.

"Lewis" has been used to anglicise the Irish name "Lugaid", the German name "Ludwig", and the French name "Louis" (the last two originally deriving from the Old Frankish name Chlodowig). It may also be a borrowing from the Isle of Lewis in the Outer Hebrides, whose name derives from the Scottish Gaelic Leòdhas.

== Variant forms ==
- Afrikaans: Louis
- Arabic: لويس (Luwīs/Lūwīs)
- Albanian: Luigj, Ludovik
- Ancient Germanic: Chlodovech, Clodovicus, Ludovicus, Clovis, Hludowig
- Armenian: Լուդովիկ (Loudovik)
- Basque: Aloxi, Koldobika, Luki, Koldo
- Breton: Loeiz, Loïc
- Bengali: লুইস, লুডউইগ, romanized: Luis/Luish, Luduig
- Bulgarian: Людовик (Lyudovik)
- Catalan: Lluís
- Chinese (traditional and simplified): 路易 (Lùyì)
- Croatian: Alojzije, Ljudevit, Ludovik, Luj, Alojz
- Czech: Ludvík, Alois, Luděk
- Danish: Ludvig, Lodvig
- Macedonian: Лудвиг (Ludvig), Луј (Luj), Људевит (Ljudevit)
- Dutch: Lodewijk, Lode, Lodevicus, Loe, Louis, Lowie, Lowieke, Ludo, Ludovicus
- English: Louis, Louie, Lou, Lewis, Lewes, Lewie, Lew, Lewy, Luey, Ludovic, Lodvig, Lodovig
- Esperanto: Ludoviko, Luĉjo
- French: Louis, Ludovic, Clovis
- Galician: Lois, Luís
- Georgian: ხლოდვიგი (Khlodvigi), ლუდვიგი (Ludvigi), ლუდოვიკო (Ludoviko), ლუი (Lui)
- German: Ludwig, Alois, Aloysius, Lutz
- Greek: Λουδοβίκος (Loudovíkos)
- Hawaiian: Lui
- Hindi: लुइस (Lu'is)
- Hungarian: Lajos, Alajos
- Irish: Alaois, Alabhaois, Laoiseach, Lughaidh
- Indonesian: Aloysius, Louis, Ludowikus
- Icelandic: Loðvík
- Italian: Aloigi, Aloisi, Aloisio, Luigi, Lodovico, Ludovico, Alvise, Gigi, Gigio, Gigino, Ginetto, Gino, Luigino, Vico
- Japanese: ルイ (Rui)
- Korean: 루이 (Lui), 루이스 (Luiseu)
- Latin: Ludovicus, Aloysius
- Latvian: Ludviķis, Ludis, Ludvigs, Luijs, Luiss, Luī, Aloizs, Aloiss
- Lithuanian: Liudvikas, Aloyzas, Liudas
- Marathi: लुईस (Lu’(w)īs)
- Medieval Occitan: Aloys, Aloysius
- Norwegian: Ludvig, Lodve
- Occitan: Loís
- Persian: لوئیز/لوئیس
- Polish: Ludwik, Alojzy
- Portuguese: Luís, Aloísio, Aluísio, Ludovico, Luisinho, Luiz
- Provençal: Louïs, Louei, Louvis
- Punjabi: ਲੂਯਿਸ (Lūyis)
- Romanian: Aloisiu, Ludovic
- Russian: Людовик (Lyudovik)
- Scottish Gaelic: Luthais
- Sicilian: Luiggi, Ludovicu
- Serbian: Луј (Luj), Људевит (Ljudevit)
- Slovak: Ľudovít, Alojz
- Slovene: Alojz, Lojze, Ljudevit, Luj, Alojzij, Ludvik
- Spanish: Luis, Ludovico
- Swedish: Ludvig, Love, Ludde
- Tamil: லூயிஸ் (Lūyis)
- Telugu: లూయిస్ (Lūyis)
- Thai: หลุยส์ (H̄luys̄̒)
- Ukrainian: Людовик (Lyudovyk)
- Welsh: Lewis, Lewys

== List of people with the given name Lewis ==
=== Nobility ===
- Lewis Hugh Clifford, 9th Baron Clifford of Chudleigh, British peer
- Lewis Joseph Hugh Clifford, 12th Baron Clifford of Chudleigh, British peer
- Lewis Hugh Clifford, 13th Baron Clifford of Chudleigh, British peer
- Lewis (Ludovick) Ogilvy-Grant, 5th Earl of Seafield, Scottish peer and Member of Parliament
- Lewis Gordon, 3rd Marquess of Huntly (c. 1626–1653), Scottish nobleman
- Lewis Mordaunt, 3rd Baron Mordaunt, British politician and peer
- Lewis Robessart, British baron
- Lewis Watson, 1st Baron Sondes, British politician and peer
- Lewis Watson, 2nd Baron Sondes, British politician and peer
- Lewis Watson, 3rd Baron Sondes, British peer

=== Politics ===
- Lewis V. Bogy (1813–1877), American politician and senator from Missouri
- Lewis Burwell, several men by the name from the Burwell family of Virginia
- Lewis Cass (1782–1886), American politician and senator from Michigan
- Lewis Stuyvesant Chanler (1869–1942), American politician and lieutenant governor of New York
- Lewis Preston Collins II (1896–1952), lieutenant governor of Virginia
- Lewis Weston Dillwyn (1778–1855), British porcelain manufacturer, naturalist and Member of Parliament (MP)
- Lewis E. Eliason (1850–1919), American politician and Lieutenant Governor of Delaware
- Lewis H. Evans (1832–1904), American politician from Pennsylvania
- Lewis Wormser Harris (1812–1876), bill-broker, financier and the first Jew elected Lord Mayor of Dublin
- Lewis Jones (politician) (1884–1968), British politician, MP for Swansea West, 1931–1945
- G. Lewis Jones (1907–1971), Assistant Secretary of State for Near Eastern and South Asian Affairs, 1959–1961
- Lewis Charles Levin (1808–1860), U.S. Congressman from Pennsylvania
- Lewis F. Linn (1796–1843), American politician and senator from Missouri
- Lewis Morris (1726–1798), signer of the American Declaration of Independence
- Lewis Morris (governor) (1671–1746), American colonial leader in New York and New Jersey
- Lewis Morris (speaker) (1698–1762), American judge, politician and landowner
- Lewis R. Morris, U.S. Representative from Vermont
- Sir Lewis Morris (1833–1907), Welsh poet, academic and politician
- Lewis E. Parsons (1817–1895), American politician and governor of Alabama
- Lewis B. Parsons Jr. (1818–1907), American Civil War general
- Lewis W. Pierce (1810–1882), American politician
- Lewis E. Reed (born 1962), American politician
- Lewis B. Schwellenbach (1894–1948), American politician and senator
- Lewis Strauss (1896–1974), American governmental official

=== Arts and entertainment ===
- Lewis Grandison Alexander (1898–1945), American poet, actor, and playwright with ties to the Harlem Renaissance
- Lewis Black (born 1948), American comedian and actor
- Lewis Brindley, British comedian and YouTuber
- Lewis Capaldi (born 1996), Scottish singer-songwriter
- Lewis Carroll (1832–1898), pen name of Charles Lutwidge Dodgson, the author of Alice in Wonderland
- Lewis Casson (1875–1969), English actor and theatre director
- Lewis Collins (1946–2013), English film and theatre actor
- Lewis D. Collins (1899–1954), American film director
- Lewis Gannett, American writer
- Lewis Hancox (born 1989), English graphic novelist, social media personality and filmmaker
- Lewis Hartsough (1828–1919), American Methodist evangelist and gospel songwriter/composer
- Lewis Hobba (born 1985), Australian radio presenter, television presenter and comedian
- Lewis Jones (1897–1939), Welsh writer and political activist
- Lewis Lovhaug, comic reviewer also known as Linkara
- Lewis Owen McGibbon (born 1991), English actor Millions (2004 film)
- Lewis Miller (Australian artist) (born 1959), Australian painter and visual artist
- Lewis Morris (1701–1765), Welsh hydrographer, antiquary, poet and lexicographer
- Lewis Nash (born 1958), American jazz drummer
- Lewis H. Nash (1852–1923), an American engineer and inventor of the liquid-ring-vacuum pump
- Lewis Pullman (born 1993), American actor
- Lewis "Lou" Reed (1942–2013), American rock musician and member of the Velvet Underground
- Lewis E. Reed (born 1962), American politician
- Lewis Shiner (born 1950), American author
- Lewis Tan (born 1987), English-born American actor and model
- Lewis Waller (1860–1915), English actor and theatre manager
- Lewis Watson (born 1992), British singer-songwriter
- Lewis Strange Wingfield (1842–1891), Irish traveller, actor, writer, and painter
- Lewys Glyn Cothi / Lewis Glyn Cothi (c. 1420–1490), 15th century Welsh poet

=== Sports ===
- Lewis Bond (born 2003), American football player
- Lewis Bradley (rugby) (1889–1918), English rugby union and rugby league footballer who played in the 1900s and 1910s
- Lewis Brown (rugby league), New Zealand rugby league player
- Lewis Burton, British tennis player and model
- Lewis Cine (born 1999), Haitian-American football player
- Lewis Collins (footballer), Welsh footballer
- Lewis Dark, footballer
- Lewis Dunk, English footballer
- Lewis Edmondson (born 1995), English professional boxer
- Lewis Gilbert (racing driver) (born 2004) British racing driver
- Lewis Hamilton (born 1985), British Formula One racing driver
- Lewis Hamilton (footballer), footballer
- Lewis Harris (rugby league), English rugby league player
- Lewis Holtby, German footballer
- Lewis Jones (Australian footballer) (1883–1960), Australian rules footballer
- Lewis Jones (footballer, born 1994), British footballer
- Lewis Jones (rugby, born 1931) (born 1931), Welsh rugby union, and rugby league footballer of the 1940s, 1950s and 1960s
- Lewis Jones (rugby player born 1992), Welsh rugby union scrum-half
- Lewis Kidd (American football) (born 1997), American football player
- Lewis Moody, English Rugby Union player
- Lewis Ormond (born 1994), New Zealand rugby union player
- Lewis Pugh, British-South African extreme swimmer, international environmental activist
- Lewis Smith (footballer), Scottish footballer
- Lewis Strapp (born 1999), Scottish footballer
- Lewis Travis, English footballer
- Lewis Williamson, racing driver
- Lewis Young, footballer

=== Religion ===
- Lewis Bagot, English Bishop of Bristol, Norwich
- Lewis Jones (bishop) (1542–1646), Bishop of Killaloe
- Lewis Bevel Jones III (1926–2018), bishop of the United Methodist Church
- Lewis B. Paton (1864–1932), American biblical scholar

=== Science ===
- Lewis Akeley (1861–1961), American academic
- Lewis Roberts Binford, American archaeologist
- Lewis Boss, American astronomer
- Lewis J. Feldman, American professor
- Lewis M. Haupt (1844–1937), American civil engineer
- Lewis Hine, American sociologist and photographer
- Lewis G. Longsworth (1904–1981), American biochemist and professor at Rockefeller University
- Lewis Ralph Jones (1864–1945), American botanist and agricultural biologist
- Lewis Wade Jones (1910–1979), sociologist and educator
- Lewis Webster Jones (1899–1975), American economist
- Lewis A. Swift, American astronomer

=== Business ===
- Lewis Ginter, American businessman and philanthropist
- Lewis Harris (philanthropist) (1900–1983), New Zealand farmer, stock dealer and philanthropist
- Lewis Gouverneur Morris, banker and social figure in New York and Newport society

=== Military ===
- Lewis Addison Armistead, American general in the American Civil War
- Lewis H. Brereton, military aviation pioneer and lieutenant general in the United States Air Force
- Lewis Collins (RAF officer) (1894–1971), British First World War flying ace
- Lewis Jones (Royal Navy officer) (1797–1895)
- Lewis Nicola, American military officer notable for authoring the Newburgh letter
- Lewis Sayre Van Duzer, US Navy officer

=== Other occupations ===
- Lewis Baxter Moore (1866–1928) American classicist, teacher, minister
- Lewis Archer Boswell, American aviator
- Lewis de Claremont, pseudonym of an American author on occultism who flourished during the 1930s
- Lewis Joel (1824–1899), British diplomat
- Lewis Jones (Patagonia) (1836–1904), one of the founders of the Welsh settlement in Patagonia who gave his name to the town of Trelew
- Lewis G. Morris, maritime advocate, sheep and cattle breeder
- Lewis Thorpe (1913–1977), British philologist and translator
- Lewis Yancey, American aviator

== Pseudonym ==
- Lewis (musician), Canadian musician

== Fictional characters ==
- Lewis (The Simpsons), a fictional character in The Simpsons
- Lewis Zimmerman, Star Trek character

== See also ==
- Aloysius
- Clovis (given name)
- Lewis (disambiguation)
- Louis (given name)
- Lugh
- Louise (given name)
- Ludwig (given name)
- Luigi (name)
- Luis
