= Alois =

- Pronunciation: German: [ˈaːloˌis, alɔʏs]
- Gender: Masculine
- Language: Occitan; German, French, Czech

Other names
- See also: Aloysius, Alajos, Aloísio, Alojz, Clovis, Louis

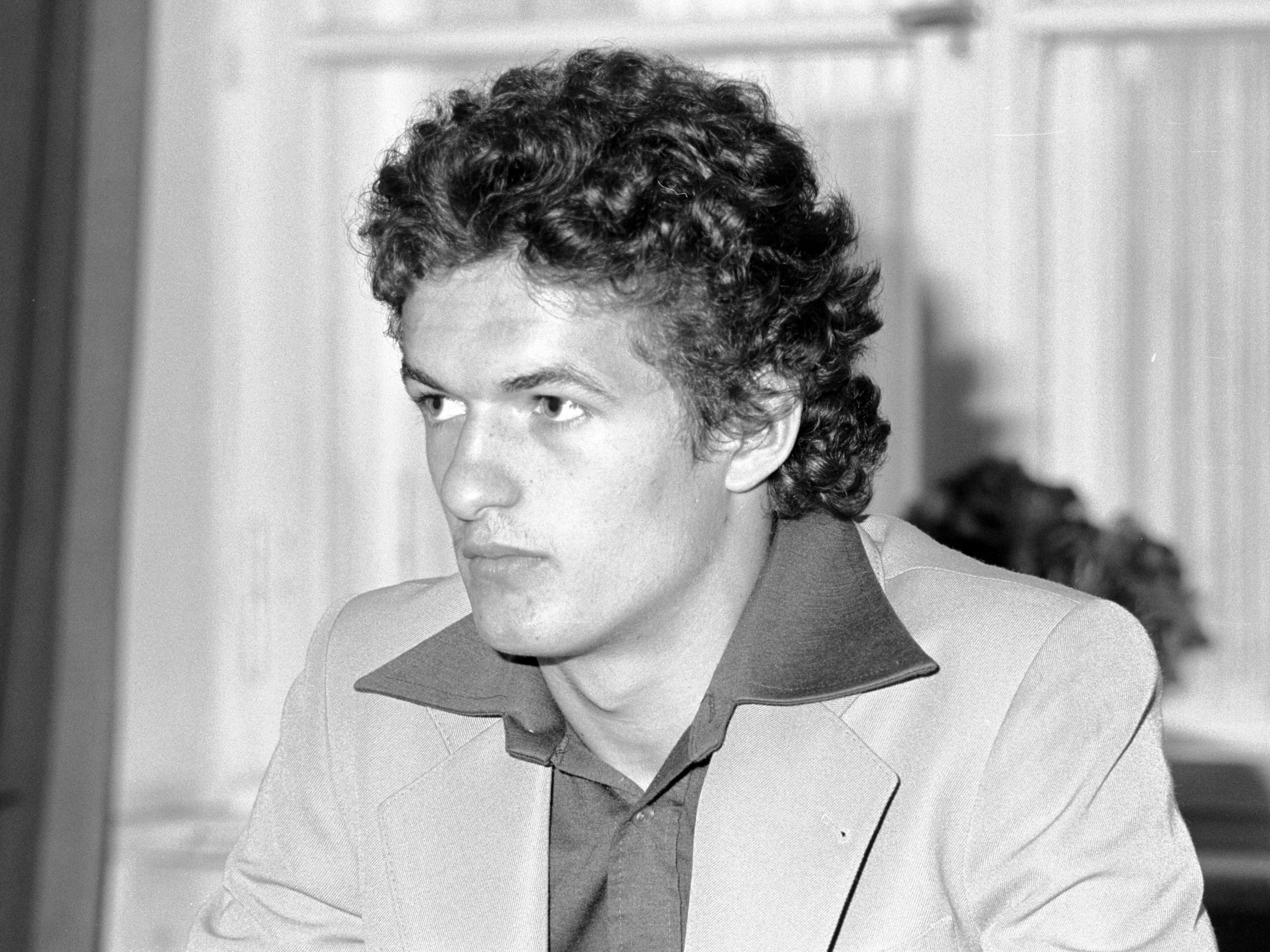
Alois Lipburger

Alois (Latinized Aloysius) is an Old Occitan form of the name Louis. Modern variants include Aloïs (French), Aloys (German), Alois (Czech), Alojz (Slovak, Slovenian, Croatian), Alojzy (Polish), Aloísio (Portuguese, Spanish, Italian), Alajos (Hungarian), and Aloyzas (Lithuanian).

== People called Alois/Aloys ==
- Alois Alzheimer (1864–1915), German psychiatrist and neuropathologist
- Alois Arnegger (1879–1963), Austrian painter
- Alois Berla (1826–1896), Austrian actor and playwright
- Alois Biach (1849–1918), Austrian physician and medical writer
- Alois Brunner (1912–2001), Austrian Nazi SS concentration camp war criminal
- Alois Carigiet (1902–1985), Swiss illustrator
- Alois Dryák (1872–1932), Czech architect
- Alois Eliáš (1890–1942), Czech general and politician
- Alois Estermann, senior officer of the Pontifical Swiss Guard who was murdered in his apartment
- Alois Hába (1893–1973), Czech composer, music theorist and teacher
- Alois Hitler (1837–1903), born Aloys Schicklgruber; Adolf Hitler's father
- Alois Hitler, Jr. (1882–1956), Adolf Hitler's half-brother
- Alois Hudal (1885–1963), Rome-based, pro-Nazi bishop of Austrian descent
- Aloys I, Prince of Liechtenstein
- Aloys II, Prince of Liechtenstein
- Alois Jirásek (1851–1930), Czech writer
- Alois Kayser (1877–1944), German Roman Catholic missionary who spent almost 40 years on Nauru and wrote a Nauruan grammar
- Alois Kříž (1911–1947), Czechoslovak journalist and Nazi collaborator who was executed
- Alois Leiter (born 1965), American former left-handed starting pitcher in Major League Baseball
- Alois Leodolter (1931–2026), Austrian Nordic combined skier and ski jumper
- Alois Lipburger (1956–2001), Austrian ski jumper
- Aloïs Michielsen (born 1942), Belgian businessman
- Alois Mock (1934–2017), Austrian politician
- Alois Musil (1868–1944), Czech explorer, orientalist and writer
- Alois Negrelli (1799–1858), Tyrolean engineer and railroad pioneer in Austria, Italy and Switzerland
- Aloys Pennarini (1870–1927), tenor opera singer, opera director and film actor
- Aloys P. Kaufmann (1902–1984), mayor of Saint Louis
- Alois P. Swoboda (1873–1938), pioneer of American physical culture
- Alois Rainer (born 1965), German politician
- Alois Rašín (1867–1923), Czech economist and politician
- Alois Riehl (1844–1924), Austrian philosopher
- Alois Senefelder (1771–1834), Austrian actor and playwright who invented the printing technique of lithography
- Alois Taux (1817–1861), German conductor and composer, prominent in Salzburg, Austria
- Alois Tomiška (1867–1946), Czech gun designer and gunsmith, inventor of the first DA/SA pistol and cofounder of Česká zbrojovka Uherský Brod
- Alois Vašátko (1908–1942), Czech fighter pilot
- Alois von Reding (1765–1818), Swiss patriot
- Alois, Hereditary Prince of Liechtenstein (born 1968)
- Alois Švehlík (1939–2025), Czech actor
- Alois Trancy, fictional character in the Japanese anime Black Butler
- Aloïs Catteau (1877–1939), Belgian cyclist
- Aloys Sprenger (1813–1893), Austrian historian
- Aloys Wach (1892–1940), Austrian expressionist painter and graphic artist
- Arnold Alois Schwarzenegger, Austrian actor and American politician
- Brother Alois (born 1954), Prior of the Taizé community
- Pope Benedict XVI (1927–2022), born Joseph Alois Ratzinger

== Other uses ==
- Aloys (film), a 2016 Swiss film
