= Chlodwig =

- Gender: Male

Other names
- Related names: Clovis, Louis, Lewis, Ludovic, Ludovico, Luigi, Luis, Ludwig, Lodewijk, Aloysius, Alois, Luiz

Chlodwig is the Old German name of Clovis I, first king of the Franks (c. 466–511). Notable people with the name Chlodwig include:

- Chlodwig, Prince of Hohenlohe-Schillingsfürst, German politician (1819–1901)
- Chlodwig, Landgrave of Hesse-Philippsthal-Barchfeld, Prussian noble (1876–1954)

== See also ==
- Clovis (disambiguation)
- Clovis (given name)
