= Clovis (given name) =

- Gender: Male

Other names
- Related names: Chlodwig, Louis, Lewis, Ludovic, Ludovico, Luigi, Luis, Ludwig, Lodewijk, Aloysius, Alois, Luiz

Clovis is the modern conventional French (and thence English) form of the Old Frankish name ᚺᛚᛟᛞᛟᚹᛁᚷ (in runic alphabet) or *"Hlōdowik" or "Hlōdowig" (in Latin alphabet), equivalent to the modern forms Louis (French), Lodewijk (Dutch), Lewis (English), and Ludwig (German).

== Etymology ==
Based on the attested forms, the Frankish name is generally reconstructed as *Hlodowig. The commonly accepted interpretation derives it from two Proto-Germanic elements,*hlūdaz ('loud, famous') and *wiganą ('to battle, to fight'), which underlies the traditional translation of Clovis's name as 'famous warrior' or 'renowned in battle'.

Linguist Reinder van der Meulen has questioned whether the traditional derivation from Proto-Germanic hlūd- ('famous') fully accounts for the vocalism found in the Merovingian forms. He notes that Gregory of Tours consistently writes Chlodo- with 'o', even though he uses 'u' elsewhere for names that etymologically contain u (e.g., Fredegundis, Guntchramnus, Arnulfus). On this basis, van der Meulen proposes that the first element might instead reflect a stem lod- ('to take booty, to plunder'), which would yield an interpretation of *Hlodowig as 'warrior for booty'. He further suggests that this interpretation would avoid the semantic redundancy that would occur in the name Chlodomer if both elements (traditionally analysed as hlūd- and -mērijaz, each meaning 'famous') were assumed to belong to the same semantic field.

== Frankish royalty ==
- Clovis I (c. 466 – 511), the first king of the Franks to unite all the Frankish tribes under one ruler
- Clovis II (637 – c. 658), king of Neustria and Burgundy
- Clovis III (reigned 675–676), the king of Austrasia
- Clovis IV (682–695), the sole king of the Franks from 691 until 695
- Clovis (died 580), son of Chilperic I and Audovera, assassinated by his father and stepmother
- Louis the Pious, son of Charlemagne, King of Aquitaine from 781 and sole ruler of the Franks 814–840, but counted as "Louis I of France" even though West Francia (the nucleus of the later kingdom of France) was formed only after his death.

== Modern use ==
Because of the importance of Clovis I in the national historiography of France, the form Clovis has been occasionally revived beginning in the 19th century. Chlodwig is a variant of Clovis.

- Chlodwig, Prince of Hohenlohe-Schillingsfürst (1819–1901)
- Clovis Hugues (1851–1907), French author
- Chlodwig, Landgrave of Hesse-Philippsthal-Barchfeld (1876–1954)
- Clovis Trouille (1889–1975), French painter
- Clovis-Thomas Richard (1892–1976), Canadian politician
- Clovis Renaison (1892–1989), French Senator
- Clovis E. Byers (1899–1979), American general
- Clovis Maksoud (1926–2016), American diplomat and journalist
- Clovis Cornillac (born 1967), French actor
- Clovis Kamdjo (born 1990), Cameroonian football player

== Fictional characters ==
- Clovis la Britannia, a character in the anime series Code Geass
- Clovis, the main antagonist in the 1997 Blade Runner video game
- Clovis Sangrail, a character in the short stories of Saki
- Clovis Dardentor, the protagonist in the Jules Verne's novel of the same name
- Clovis, a minor character in Rick Riordan's Heroes of Olympus series
- Clovis, a major supporting character in Keith Knight's Woke series
- Rush Clovis, supporting character in the Star Wars Universe who appears in Star Wars: The Clone Wars
- Clovis Bray, a character appearing in the lore of the games Destiny and Destiny 2 and later revealed as a character in Destiny 2: Beyond Light

== See also ==
- Clovis (disambiguation)
