= Ludo (disambiguation) =

Ludo is a strategy board game.

Ludo may also refer to:

== Film and television ==
- Ludo (film), a 2020 Indian Hindi-language film
- Ludo (France Télévisions), a 2009–2019 brand for youth broadcasting on France Télévisions channels
- Ludo Studio, an Australian live-action and animation production studio

== Music ==
- Ludo (band), an American alternative rock band
- Ludo (Ivor Cutler album), 1967
- Ludo (Ludo album), 2004
- Ludo (soundtrack), from the 2020 film

== Other uses ==
- Ludo (given name), including a list of people and fictional characters with the name
- Ludo King, Indian video game based on the board game
- VinFast Ludo, an electric scooter

== See also ==
- Pachisi, ancient Indian board game, ancestor of Ludo
- Ludovic, a given name and surname
