= Ludovic =

- Gender: Male
- Language: German

Origin
- Origin: French
- Meaning: Famous warrior (Ludwig)

Other names
- Related names: Clovis, Louis, Lewis, Ludovico, Luigi, Luis, Ludvig, Ludwig, Aloysius

Ludovic is a given name and surname. Notable people with the name include:

== People with the given name ==
- Ludovic Albós Cavaliere (born 1979), Andorran ski mountaineer
- Ludovic Ambruș (born 1946), Romanian wrestler who competed in the 1972 Summer Olympics
- Ludovic Antal (1924–1970), Romanian actor and cultural promoter
- Ludovic Arrachart (1897–1933), French aviator
- Ludovic Assemoassa (1980–2025), French-born Togolese football player and coach
- Ludovic Asuar (born 1976), French footballer
- Ludovic Auger (born 1971), French road bicycle racer
- Ludovic Augustin (1902–?), Haitian Olympic sport shooter
- Ludovic Baal (born 1986), French Guianese football left back
- Ludovic Batelli (born 1963), French football goalkeeper
- Ludovic Blas (born 1997), French football midfielder
- Ludovic Boi (born 1989), Mauritian-Australian footballer
- Ludovic Booz (1940–2015), Haitian painter and sculptor
- Ludovic Bource (born 1970), French composer
- Ludovic Boulesteix (fl. 1990s), French slalom canoer
- Ludovic Bruckstein (1920–1988), Romanian writer
- Ludovic Bruni (born 1976), French guitarist, bassist and music producer
- Ludovic Butelle (born 1983), French footballer
- Ludovic Buysens (born 1986), Belgian footballer
- Ludovic Capelle (born 1976), Belgian road racing cyclist
- Ludovic Caserne, Mauritian politician
- Ludovic Chammartin (born 1985), Swiss judoka
- Ludovic Chelle (born 1983), Malian-French basketball player
- Ludovic Clément (born 1976), Martiniquais footballer
- Ludovic Clemente (born 1986), Andorran footballer
- Ludovic Colquhoun (1804–1882), Texas Senator and merchant of San Antonio, Texas
- Ludovic Dauș (1873–1953), Romanian prose writer, playwright, poet and translator
- Ludovic Debeurme, French comic artist
- Ludovic Delporte (born 1980), French football midfielder
- Ludovic Depickère (born 1969), French magician and freestyle swimmer
- Ludovic Fabregas (born 1996), French handball player
- Ludovic Franck (1907–1988), Belgian sailor
- Ludovic G. (1835–1886), pen name of Jean Louis Gobbaerts, Belgian pianist and composer
- Ludovic Gamboa (born 1986), French football midfielder
- Ludovic Gapenne, Paralympian athlete from France
- Ludovic Garreau (born 1983), French ice hockey player
- Ludovic Genest (born 1987), French footballer
- Ludovic Giuly (born 1976), French football winger
- Ludovic Golliard (born 1983), French footballer
- Ludovic Gotin (born 1985), Guadeloupean footballer
- Ludovic Graugnard (born 1977), French football manager
- Ludovic Guerriero (born 1985), French football defensive midfielder
- Ludovic Halévy (1834–1908), French author and playwright
- Ludovic Henry (born 1968), French Olympic dressage rider
- Ludovic Heraud (1913–2007), French sports shooter
- Ludovic Hubler, French traveller
- Ludovic Janvier (1934–2016), French novelist, poet, essayist, and short stories writer
- Ludovic Jean-Luc Butelle (born 1983), French footballer
- Ludovic Kashindi (born 1984), Canadian football defensive back
- Ludovic Kennedy (1919–2009), British journalist, broadcaster, humanist and author
- Ludovic Lalanne (1815–1898), French historian and librarian
- Ludovic Lamothe (1882–1953), Haitian composer and virtuoso pianist
- Ludovic Lebart, French statistician
- Ludovic Lefebvre (born 1971), French chef and restaurateur
- Ludovic Leroy (born 1975), French footballer
- Ludovic Lewis, Welsh politician who sat in the House of Commons from 1647 to 1653
- Ludovic Lindsay, 16th Earl of Crawford (1600–1652), Scot who took part in the plot of 1641 called The Incident
- Ludovic Lidon (born 1971), French football defender
- Ludovic Liron (born 1978), French football defender
- Ludovic Loquet (born 1965), French politician
- Ludovic Loustau (born 1973), French rugby union footballer
- Ludovic Magnin (born 1979), Swiss football manager and defender
- Ludovic Martin (born 1976), French cyclist
- Ludovic Mary (born 1977), French footballer
- Ludovic Mercier (born 1976), French rugby union player
- Ludovic Millet (born 1985), French kickboxer
- Ludovic Morlot (born 1973), French conductor
- Ludovic Mrazek (1867–1944), Romanian geologist
- Ludovic Obraniak (born 1984), French-born Polish footballer
- Ludovic O'Followell, French doctor and author
- Ludovic Orban (born 1963), Romanian engineer and politician
- Ludovic Pancrate (born 1987), French footballer
- Ludovic Paratte (born 1992), Swiss footballer
- Ludovic Piette (1826–1878), French Impressionist painter
- Ludovic Pollet (born 1970), French footballer
- Ludovic Pommeret, French runner
- Ludovic Charles Porter (1869–1928), British administrator in India
- Ludovic Proto (born 1965), French boxer who competed at the 1988 Summer Olympics
- Ludovic Quistin (1984–2012), Guadeloupean football defender
- Ludovic Radosavljevic (born 1989), French rugby union player
- Ludovic Routhier (1931–2018), Canadian politician from Quebec
- Ludovic Roux (born 1979), French Nordic combined skier
- Ludovic Roy (born 1977), French football goalkeeper
- Ludovic Saline (born 1989), French footballer
- Ludovic Savatier (1830–1891), French botanist
- Ludovic Soares (born 1994), French footballer
- Ludovic Stewart, 2nd Duke of Lennox (1574–1624), Scottish nobleman and politician
- Ludovic Stuart, Scottish rugby union player
- Ludovic Sylvestre (born 1984), French football midfielder
- Ludovic Tézier (born 1968), French Opera Singer
- Ludovic Trarieux (1840–1904), French Republican statesman
- Ludovic Turpin (born 1975), French road racing cyclist
- Ludovic Valbon (born 1976), French rugby union footballer
- Ludovic Valborge (1889–1945), Olympic sport shooter from Haiti
- Ludovic Vitet (1802–1873), French dramatist and politician
- Ludovic Zanoni (1935–2021), Romanian cyclist

== Fictional characters with the given name ==
- Ludovic Bagman, in J.K. Rowling's book Harry Potter and the Goblet of Fire
- Ludovic "Ludo" Fabre (Georges Du Fresne), protagonist of the 1997 film Ma vie en rose
- Ludovic “Ludo” in Helen Dewitt’s book The Last Samurai

== People with the surname ==
- Alexandre Ludovic (born 1990), Portuguese professional footballer

== See also ==
- Ludo (given name)
- Ludovica
- Ludvig
- Louis (given name)
