= Luis =

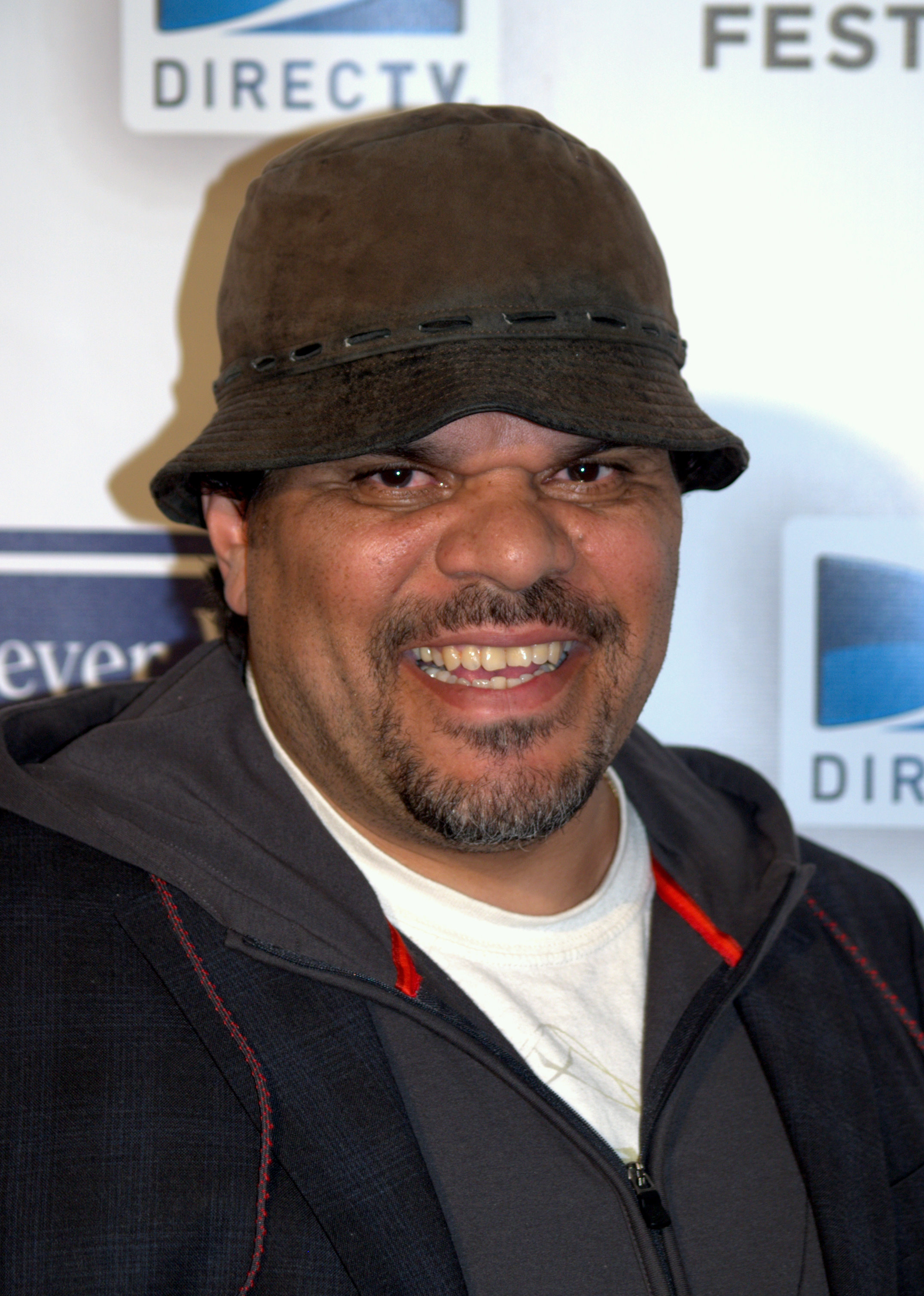
- Luis Guzmán at the 2009 premiere of Whatever Works.
- Pronunciation: Spanish: [ˈlwis] Portuguese: [luˈiʃ, lwiʃ, luˈis, lwis]
- Gender: Male
- Language: Spanish, Portuguese (Luís), Galician

Other gender
- Feminine: Luisa

Origin
- Meaning: Famous warrior

Other names
- Variant forms: Luís, Luiz
- Pet names: Luisito, Luisinho, Lucho
- Related names: Alois, Clovis, Lewis, Louis, Ludovic, Ludovico, Ludvík, Ludwig, Luigi, Lajos

Luis is a given name. It is the Spanish form of the originally Germanic name Hludowig or Chlodovech, which were introduced to the Iberian Peninsula during its occupation by the Visigoths. Other Iberian Romance languages have comparable forms: Luís (with an accent mark on the i) in Portuguese and Galician, Lluís in Catalan and Loís in Aragonese, while Luíz is archaic in Portugal, but common in Brazil.

== Origins ==
The Germanic name Chlodowig (and its variants) is usually said to be composed of the words for "fame" (hlūd) and "warrior" (wīġ) and hence may be translated to famous warrior or "famous in battle". According to Dutch onomatologists however, it is more likely that the first stem was (h)lod-, meaning fame, which would give the meaning 'warrior for the gods' (or: 'warrior who captured stability') for the full name.

Modern forms of the name are the German name Ludwig and the Dutch form Lodewijk. Luis and the other Iberian forms more closely resemble the French name Louis, a derivation of the Latinized form Clovis, known from the kings of the Franks. The sanctified French king Louis IX (Saint Louis) contributed much to the popularity of the name.

== Given name ==
=== Arts and entertainment ===
- Luis Antonio Ramos, Puerto Rican actor
- Luis Antonio Rivera, Puerto Rican television host
- Luis Bezeta, Spanish visual artist and filmmaker
- Luis Brandoni, Argentine actor and politician
- Luis Buñuel, Spanish film director
- Lluís Claret, Andorran cellist
- Luis Enrique, Nicaraguan singer
- Luis Fernando Vager, Puerto Rican musician and producer
- Luis Fonsi, Puerto Rican singer
- Luis Gatica, Mexican-Chilean-Puerto Rican actor and singer
- Luis Guzmán, Puerto Rican actor
- Luis Roberto Guzmán, Puerto Rican actor
- Lluís Llach, Catalan composer
- Luis Manzano, Filipino actor and television host
- Luis Egidio Meléndez, Spanish painter
- Luis Miguel, Mexican singer
- Luis Oquendo, Cuban actor
- Luis "Perico" Ortiz, Puerto Rican musician
- Luis Puenzo, Argentine film director, producer and screenplay writer
- Luis Rego, Portuguese actor and musician
- Luis Sanguino, Spanish sculptor
- Luis Segura, Dominican singer
- Luis Vargas, Dominican singer
- Luis Vigoreaux Lorenzana, Puerto Rican television host
- Luis Vigoreaux Rivera, Puerto Rican television host
- Luis Ferdinand Vega, known as Little Louie Vega, American DJ, record producer and Grammy Award winner remixer of Puerto Rican ancestry

=== Politicians and government officials ===
- Luis Alberto de Herrera, Uruguayan politician
- Luis E. Arreaga, Guatemalan-American diplomat
- Luis Arce, Bolivian politician and current president of Bolivia
- Luis Ortega Álvarez, Spanish judge
- Luis Carrillo, Spanish colonial administrator
- Luis Motta Domínguez, Venezuelan politician and military officer
- Luis Alberto Lacalle, former president of Uruguay
- Luis Ángel González Macchi, former president of Paraguay
- Lluís Companys i Jover, Catalan politician
- Luis Conrado Batlle y Berres, former president of Uruguay
- Luis María del Corazón de Jesús Dionisio Argaña Ferraro, Paraguayan politician
- Luis R. Esteves, Major General, Puerto Rican-American military leader
- Luis Alberto Ferré Aguayo, former Governor of Puerto Rico (1969–1973)
- Luis Fortuño, Governor of Puerto Rico (2009–2013)
- Luis Guinot, Puerto Rican-American diplomat
- Luis Gutiérrez, Puerto Rican-American political leader
- Luis Mangalus Taruc, Filipino politician
- Luis Mena, president of Nicaragua
- Luis Muñoz Marín, first democratically elected governor of Puerto Rico
- Luis Muñoz de Guzmán, a Spanish colonial administrator
- Luis Enrique Oberto (1928–2022), Venezuelan politician
- Luis Redondo, Honduran politician and engineer, deputy and president of the National Congress of Honduras
- Luis Muñoz Rivera, Puerto Rican politician and father of Luis Muñoz Marín
- Luis Rodríguez de Miguel (1910–1982), Spanish politician and jurist
- Luis D. Rovira (1923–2011), associate justice of the Colorado Supreme Court
- Luis Viera, American politician from Florida

=== Royalty of Portugal ===
- Luís I of Portugal (1838–1889), Portuguese king
- Infante Luís (1340-1340), first son of King Pedro I of Portugal
- Prince Luís, Duke of Beja (1506–1555)
- Luís Filipe, Prince Royal of Portugal (1887–1908)

=== Sports ===
- Luis Alberto González, Colombian cyclist (1965)
- Luis Alberto Pérez, Nicaraguan boxer (1978)
- Luis Alberto Pérez-Rionda, Cuban runner (1969)
- Luis Amaranto Perea, Colombian football player (1979)
- Luis Antonio Jiménez, Chilean footballer (1984)
- Luis Aragonés, Spanish football player and manager (1938–2014)
- Luis Arráez, Venezuelan baseball player (1997)
- Luis Alberto Ayala, Chilean tennis player (1932–2024)
- Luis Ignacio Ayala, Mexican baseball pitcher (1978)
- Luis Barrera, Dominican baseball player (1995)
- Luis Barrios, Peruvian basketball player (1990)
- Luis Caballero, Paraguayan footballer (1962–2005)
- Luis Campusano, American baseball player (1998)
- Lluís Carreras, Spanish footballer (1972)
- Luis Antonio Castillo, Dominican baseball player (1975)
- Luis Alberto Castillo, Dominican-American football player (1983)
- Luis Felipe Castillo, Dominican baseball player (1995)
- Luis Miguel Castillo, Dominican baseball player (1992)
- Luis Cessa, Mexican baseball player (1992)
- Luis Cristaldo, Bolivian footballer
- Luis Cruz Donoso
- Luis Daniel Cupla, Uruguayan footballer
- Luis Díaz, Venezuelan volleyball player
- Luís Dutra Jr., Brazilian mixed martial arts fighter
- Luis Engelns (born 2007), German footballer
- Luis Enrique, Spanish football player and manager
- Luis Ernesto José, Dominican boxer
- Luis Ernesto Michel, Mexican football goalkeeper
- Luís Fabiano, Brazilian football player
- Luis Fernando Suárez, Colombian football player and manager
- Luís Figo, Portuguese football player
- Luis Frías, Dominican baseball player
- Luis Amado García, Dominican baseball player (1987)
- Luis Heibardo García, Venezuelan baseball player (1996)
- Luis Henrique, Brazilian football player (2001)
- Luis García Jr., Dominican-American baseball player (2000)
- Luis García Sanz, Spanish football player
- Luis Galván, Argentine football player
- Luis Ángel Gil, Dominican baseball player
- Luis Miguel Gil, American soccer player
- Luis Emilio Gonzalez, Cuban-American baseball player
- Luis Fernando González, Mexican baseball player
- Luis Guillorme, Venezuelan baseball player
- Luis Hasa, Italian football player
- Luis Liberato, Dominican baseball player
- Luis Manuel Rodríguez, Cuban boxer
- Luis Marín, Costa Rican football player
- Luís Martins, Portuguese football player
- Luis Matos (born 2002), Venezuelan baseball outfielder
- Luis Ángel Medina, Dominican baseball player
- Luis Main Medina, American baseball player
- Luis Monti, Italian and Argentine football player and manager
- Luís Novo, Portuguese long-distance runner
- Luis Olmo, Puerto Rican baseball player
- Luis Onmura, Brazilian judoka
- Luis Alberto Ortiz, Dominican baseball player and coach
- Luis Francisco Ortiz, American baseball player
- Luis Leandro Ortiz, Dominican baseball player
- Luis Ortiz Flores, Puerto Rican boxer
- Luis Palau, Argentine-American televangelist
- Luis Palomino, Peruvian mixed martial arts fighter
- Luis Patiño, Colombian baseball player
- Luis Patiño (tennis), Mexican tennis player
- Luis David Perdomo, Dominican baseball player
- Luis M. Perdomo, Dominican baseball player
- Luis Perez, American football player
- Luis Pizarro, Puerto Rican boxer
- Luis Rengifo, Venezuelan baseball player
- Luis Rivera (infielder), Puerto Rican baseball player and coach
- Luis Robert, Cuban baseball player
- Luis Orlando Rodríguez, Venezuelan baseball player
- Luis Rodríguez, Puerto Rican volleyball player Luis Rodríguez
- Luis Rojas (baseball), Dominican baseball player and coach
- Luis Salvadores Salvi, Chilean basketball player
- Luis Salom (1991–2016), Spanish Grand prix motorcycle racer
- Luis Santos (baseball), Dominican baseball pitcher
- Luís Santos (water polo), Brazilian water polo goalkeeper
- Luis Severino, Dominican baseball player
- Luis Sinclair, Panamanian basketball player
- Luis Soares, Portuguese-French long-distance runner
- Luis Somoza Debayle, former president of Nicaragua
- Luis Suárez (Uruguayan footballer), Uruguayan footballer (1987)
- Luis Suárez Miramontes, Spanish football player and manager
- Luis Terrero, Dominican baseball player
- Luis Tiant, Cuban-American baseball player
- Luis Torrens, Venezuelan baseball player
- Luis Urías, Mexican baseball player
- Luis Urueta, Colombian baseball coach
- Luis Vasquez, American football player
- Luis Villar, Argentine basketball player
- Luis Villarroel, Venezuelan diver
- Luis Vizcaíno, Dominican baseball player

=== Writers ===
- Luís de Camões, Portuguese poet
- Luis Lloréns Torres, Puerto Rican playwright and poet
- Luís Nassif, Brazilian writer and journalist
- Luis López Nieves, Puerto Rican writer
- Luis Palés Matos, Puerto Rican author
- Luis Rafael Sánchez, Puerto Rican playwright

=== Other ===
- Luis F. Alvarez, Spanish-American physician (grandfather of Luis W. Alvarez)
- Luis W. Álvarez, Spanish-American physicist, winner of the 1968 Nobel Prize in Physics
- Luis Aponte Martínez, Puerto Rican religious leader
- Luis de Moscoso Alvarado, Spanish explorer and conquistador
- Lluís Domènech i Montaner, Catalan architect
- Luis Enríquez de Guzmán, 9th Count of Alba de Liste, Spanish nobleman
- Luis Jacob, Peruvian-Canadian visual artists and photographer
- Luis Garavito, prolific Colombian serial killer and rapist
- Luis González Vale, Puerto Rican historian
- Luis Lliboutry, French-Chilean glaciologist
- Luis Marden, American photographer
- Luis Marileo Colipí, Mapuche chief
- Luis Miranda Casañas, Puerto Rican businessman
- Luis M. Rocha, American-Portuguese professor and scientist
- Luis Née, explorer, botanist, discovered Coast Live Oak in California
- Luis Padial, Puerto Rican military leader
- Luis Parada, Salvadoran lawyer
- Luis Posada Carriles, Cuban militant
- Luis Rodríguez Zúñiga (1942–1991), Spanish sociologist
- Luis Sera, a character in Resident Evil 4
- Luis Scott-Vargas, American Magic: the Gathering player
- Luis Antonio Tagle, Filipino cardinal and current prefect of the Congregation for the Evangelization of Peoples

Middle name

- José Luis Corcuera (born 1944), Spanish politician

== See also ==
- Lewis (given name)
- Louis (given name)
- Lucho
- Luiz (given name)
