= Aloísio =

Aloisio or Aloísio is a Romance masculine given name, arising via an Old Occitan form Aloys, whence "Louis". People with the given name include:

- Aloísio Sebastião Boeing (1913–2006), Brazilian Catholic Dehonian priest
- Aloísio Sinésio Bohn (1934–2022), Brazilian Roman Catholic bishop
- Aloisio Butonidualevu (1983–2023), Fijian rugby union player
- Aloísio Francisco da Luz (1931–2020), Brazilian footballer
- Aloisio da Milano, also known as Aloisio da Carezano, Aleviz Milanets and Aleviz Fryazin, 15th/16th century Italian architect
- Aloísio da Silva Filho (born 1974), Brazilian footballer (goalkeeper)
- Aloísio José da Silva (born 1975), Brazilian footballer (striker)
- Aloísio de Oliveira (1914–1995), Brazilian record producer, singer and actor
- Aloísio Hilário de Pinho (1934–2021), Brazilian Roman Catholic bishop
- Aloísio dos Santos Gonçalves (born 1988), Brazilian-Chinese footballer (striker)
- Aloisio Galea (1851–1905), Maltese theologian and philosopher
- Aloisio Gardellini (1759–1829), Italian editor and compiler of religious documents
- Aloisio Gonzaga (1494–1549), Italian condottiero
- Alipate Aloisio Leone (born 1982), known as Tama Tonga, Tongan-American wrestler
- Aloísio Lima (born 1973), Brazilian Paralympic table tennis player
- Aloísio Lorscheider (1924–2007), Brazilian Roman Catholic cardinal
- Aloísio Magalhães (1927–1982), Brazilian graphic designer
- Aloísio Neto (born 1997), Brazilian footballer
- Aloisio the New, 16th century Italian Renaissance architect
- Matteo Aloisio Niedhammer y Yaeckle (1901–1970), American Capuchin friar and Roman Catholic bishop
- Aloisio Emor Ojetuk, South Sudanese politician
- Aloísio Roque Oppermann (1936–2014), Brazilian Roman Catholic bishop
- Aloísio Pires Alves (born 1963), Brazilian footballer (defender)
- Luigi Aloisio Riccio (1817–1873), Italian Roman Catholic bishop
- Aloísio Teixeira Garcia (1944–2024), Brazilian academic and politician

People with the surname include:

- Antonio Aloisio (1898–1977), Canadian politician
- Ottorino Aloisio (1902–1986), Italian architect
- Mohamed Aloisio (born 1979), Spanish footballer
- William Aloisio (1906–1979), American mobster

== See also ==
- Aloysius
