= Luis Miranda =

Luis Miranda may refer to:

- Luis Miranda (painter) (1932–2016), Ecuadorian painter
- Luis Miranda (Canadian politician)
- Luis Miranda (Brazilian politician)
- Luis A. Miranda Jr., New York political activist
- Luis Miranda (footballer), Colombian footballer

== See also ==
- Luis Miranda Casañas, Puerto Rican businessman
- Luis de Miranda (born 1971), novelist, philosopher, editor, and film director
