= Clovis Community College =

Clovis Community College may refer to:

- Clovis Community College (New Mexico)
- Clovis Community College (California)
