= Clovis =

Clovis may refer to:

== Archaeology ==
- Clovis culture, Paleo-Indian culture of North America
  - Clovis point, the oldest flint tools associated with the North American Clovis culture
- Clovis comet, a hypothetical impact event around 12,800 years ago

== People ==
- Clovis (given name), the early medieval (Frankish) form of the name Louis
  - Clovis I (c. 466 – 511), the first king of the Franks to unite all the Frankish tribes under one ruler
  - Clovis II (c. 634 – c. 657), king of Neustria and Burgundy and first of the Rois Fainéants
  - Clovis III (reigned 675–676), king of Austrasia, considered a usurper by some
  - Clovis IV (c. 677–694), boy king of the Franks from 691 until 694
  - Clovis (died 580), son of Chilperic I and Audovera, assassinated by his father and stepmother
  - Clóvis (footballer, born 1937), Clóvis Pinheiro dos Santos, Brazilian footballer
  - Clóvis (footballer, born 1970), Clóvis Bento da Cruz, Brazilian football striker
- Anzick-1, a prehistoric person sometimes referred to as the "Clovis Boy" or "Clovis Child" because of his association with Clovis culture.

== Places ==
- Clovis, California
  - Clovis Unified School District, serving Clovis and Fresno
- Clovis, New Mexico
  - Clovis Municipal School District
  - Clovis Municipal Airport

== Other ==
- Clovis Dardentor, 1896 fiction novel by French writer Jules Verne
- Clovis Sangrail, a character in the short stories of Saki, named because he was "so appallingly frank"
- Clovis, the main antagonist in the 1997 Blade Runner video game
- Clovis la Britannia, a character in the anime series Code Geass
- Clovis Crawfish the lead character in the book series Clovis the Crawfish
- Clovis Oncology, pharmaceutical company
- Clovis (album), a 2026 album by Charley Crockett

== See also ==
- Clovis High School (disambiguation)
