= Lou (given name) =

Lou is a unisex given name. For males, it is frequently a short form (hypocorism) of Louis or Lewis, for females of Louise, etc. It may refer to:

== People ==
=== Men ===
- Lou Adler (born 1933), American record producer, music executive, talent manager, songwriter and film director and producer
- Lou Adler (journalist) (1929–2017), American radio journalist and academic
- Lou Albano (1933–2009), Italian-American professional wrestler, manager and actor
- Lou Bega (born 1975), German singer
- Lou Boudreau (1917–2001), American Hall of Fame baseball player
- Lou Brock (1939–2020), American Hall-of-Fame Major League Baseball player
- Lou Busch (1910–1979), American musician and songwriter
- Lou Cannon (1933–2025), American journalist, non-fiction author and biographer
- Lou Costello, stage name of American actor and comedian Louis Cristillo (1906–1959)
- Lou Diamond Phillips, American actor and director born James Diamond in 1962
- Lou DiBella, American boxing promoter and television/film producer
- Lou Dobbs (1945–2024), American television anchor, radio host and author
- Lou Duva, American boxing trainer and boxing promoter
- Lou Ferrigno (born 1951), American bodybuilder and actor
- Lou Ferrigno Jr. (born 1984), American actor
- Lou Frizzell (1920–1979), American actor and music director
- Lou Gehrig (1903–1941), American Hall-of-Fame Major League Baseball player
- Lou Gerstner (1942–2025), American businessman
- Lou Gordon (American football) (1908–1976), American National Football League player
- Lou Gordon (journalist) (1917–1977), American radio and television commentator and newspaper reporter
- Lou Gramm, stage name of American rock singer and songwriter Louis Grammatico (b. 1950)
- Lou Groza (1924–2000), American footballer, Hall of Fame placekicker for the Cleveland Browns
- Lou Harrison (1917–2003), American composer
- Lou Hedley (born 1993), Australian American football player
- Lou Henson (1932–2020), American basketball coach
- Lou Holtz (born 1937), American former football player, coach and analyst
- Lou Jacobi (1913–2009), Canadian actor
- Lou Jacobs (1903–1992), German-American circus clown
- Lou Johnson (1934–2020), American baseball player
- Lou Johnson (pitcher) (1869–1941), American baseball pitcher
- Lou Johnson (singer) (1941–2019), American soul singer and pianist
- Lou Kenton (1908–2012), English proofreader
- Lou Kilzer (born 1951), American journalist
- Lou Kolls (1892–1941), American baseball umpire
- Lou Marini (born 1945), American saxophonist, arranger and composer
- Lou Merrill (1912–1963), American actor
- Lou Michaels (1935–2016), American football player
- Lou Pearlman (1954–2016), American record producer
- Lou Phelan (1864–1933), American baseball manager
- Lou Piniella (born 1943), American former Major League Baseball player and manager
- Lou Preager (1906–1978), British dance band leader
- Lou Rawls (1933–2006), American singer, songwriter and record producer
- Lou Reed (1942–2013), American musician, singer and songwriter
- Lou Reed (rugby union) (born 1987), Welsh rugby union footballer
- Lou Richards (1923–2017), Australian rules footballer and sports journalist
- Lou Rinaldi (disambiguation), several people
- Lou Savarese, American boxing-fighter
- Louis J. Sebille (1915–1950), American Korean War pilot posthumously awarded the Medal of Honor
- Lou Silver, American-Israeli basketball player
- Lou Sullivan (1951–1991), American author and activist known for his work on behalf of trans men
- Lou Thesz (1916–2002), American professional wrestler
- Lou Vairo (born 1945), American ice hockey coach
- Lou Viglione, former NASCAR Cup Series team owner
- Lou Vincent (born 1945), New Zealand cricket player
- Lou Williams (born 1986), American National Basketball Association player
- Lou Zocchi (1935–2026), American gaming hobbyist, game distributor and publisher

=== Women ===
- Lou Andreas-Salomé (1861–1937), Russian-born psychoanalyst and author
- Lou Doillon (born 1982), French singer-songwriter, actress, and model
- Lou Fellingham (born 1974), English contemporary Christian singer and songwriter
- Lou Henry Hoover (1874–1944), wife of US President Herbert Hoover
- Lou Jean (born 2004), stage name Lou (French singer)
- Louise Lieberman (born 1977), American soccer coach and former player
- Lou Sanders, British comedian
- Lou Wotton (born 1983), Australian rules footballer

=== Non-binary people ===
- Lou Wall, Australian comedian

== Fictional TV characters ==
- Lou Beale, on the BBC soap opera EastEnders
- Lou Grant, on The Mary Tyler Moore Show and Lou Grant
- Lou Solverson, on Fargo
- Lou Zer, a fictional character in Rock Paper Scissors
- Lou (The Simpsons), a policeman on The Simpsons
- Lou (Ninjago), in Ninjago
- Lou, a character in the 2019 film UglyDolls
- Lou, a female Flashman on Choushinsei Flashman
