= Alojzy =

Alojzy is a given name. Notable people with the name include:

- Alojzy Ehrlich (1914–1992), Polish table tennis player
- Alojzy Feliński (1771–1820), Polish writer
- Alojzy Lysko (born 1942), Polish politician
- Alojzy Wir-Konas (1894–1940), Polish Army colonel
- Alojzy Gonzaga Jazon Żółkowski (1814–1889), Polish comedian, actor and singer
