= Luisito =

Luisito is a hypocorism of the Spanish name Luis, which may also be found as a given name. Notable people include:

- Luisito Campisi (born 1987), Italian footballer
- Luisito Comunica (born 1991), Mexican YouTuber
- Luisito Espinosa (born 1967), Filipino boxer
- Luisito Martí (1945–2010), Dominican musician, comedian, actor, producer and television host
- Luisito Occiano (born 1971), Filipino Roman Catholic prelate
- Luisito Pié (born 1994), Dominican taekwondo athlete
- Luisito Rey (1945–1992), Spanish singer-songwriter
- Luisito Vigoreaux (born 1951), Puerto Rican actor and producer
