= Clovis Community College (New Mexico) =

Community college in Clovis, New Mexico, U.S.

Coordinates: 34.4022°N 103.1668°W

- Other name: CCC
- Motto: To Dream, To Achieve, To Succeed
- Type: Public community college
- Established: July 1, 1991
- President: Jonathan Fuentes
- Faculty: 52
- Students: 3596
- Location: Clovis, New Mexico, United States
- Campus: Rural, c. 100 acres (40 ha)
- Website: www.clovis.edu

Clovis Community College (CCC) is a public community college in Clovis, New Mexico. Due to the close proximity and past connections, CCC works closely with Eastern New Mexico University to provide area residents with educational opportunities.

== History ==
Clovis Community College was established in 1961 as a branch campus of Eastern New Mexico University in conjunction with the Clovis Municipal Schools. The current campus was constructed in 1978 and rests on 25 acres (100,000 m^{2}) of land donated by Ervin Schepps. Over time, CCC grew to cover 100 acres (0.40 km^{2}). In 1990, local voters established CCC as a locally governed independent community college.

In recent years, CCC has made efforts to modernize the curriculum including the addition of online courses and computer-based learning. In the fall of 2006, students were issued school email addresses to improve communication and online education.

In the summer of 2006, CCC was assured by the New Mexico Board of Education that its funding would not be cut for at least one year, despite recent enrollment declines. Similar declines were seen throughout the state, but CCC suffered a loss of over 10% from 2004 to 2006.

In the summer of 2006, the board of trustees approved the contract of CCC's newest president, John Neibling.

== Accreditations ==
Clovis Community College is accredited by the following organizations:

- Higher Learning Commission
- National League for Nursing Accrediting Commission
- Joint Review Committee on Education in Radiologic Technology (JRCERT)

Additionally, the New Mexico State Board of Education has approved CCC as a State of New Mexico Area Vocational School.
