= Lucho =

Lucho is a Spanish nickname for the name Luis.

Lucho may refer to:

- Lucho (footballer, born 2003), Colombian footballer
- Lucho Avilés (1938–2019), Argentine journalist
- Lucho Ayala (born 1992), Filipino actor
- Lucho Barrios (1935–2010), Peruvian singer
- Lucho Bermúdez (1912–1994), Colombian musician
- Lucho Fernández (basketball) (born 1975), Spanish basketball player
- Lucho García (born 1998), Colombian footballer
- Lucho Gatica (1928–2018), Chilean singer
- Lucho González (born 1981), Argentine footballer
- Lucho Olivera (1942–2005), Argentine comic book artist and writer
- Luis Arce (born 1963), 67th President of Bolivia
- Luis Díaz (born 1997), Colombian footballer
- Lucho Vega (born 1999), Argentine footballer
