= Aloyzas =

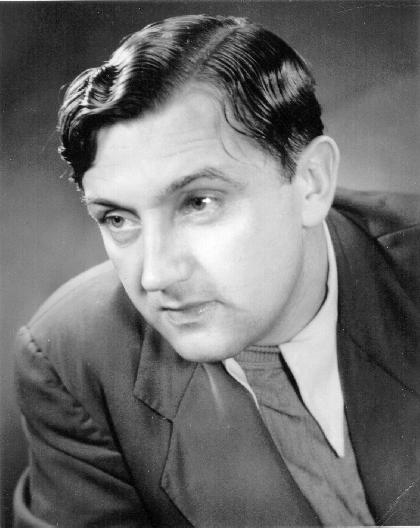
Aloyzas Baronas

Aloyzas is a masculine given name of Lithuanian origin. People with that name include:

- Aloyzas Kveinys (1962–2018), Lithuanian chess Grandmaster
- Aloyzas Sakalas (1931–2022), Lithuanian politician
- Aloyzas Stasiulevičius (born 1931), Lithuanian painter, art teacher and critic
