= Luděk =

Luděk is a Czech masculine given name. It is the Czech short name of the Slavonic name Ludoslav or Ludomír, later becoming a proper name in its own right.

== Pet form ==
Ludia, Ludík, Ludo, Slávek, Slavo, Ludine

== Famous bearers ==
- Luděk Bohman - Czech athlete
- Luděk Bukač - Czech ice hockey player
- Luděk Hulan - Czech jazz bass player
- Luděk Kopřiva - Czech actor
- Luděk Krayzel - Czech ice hockey player
- Luděk Marold - Czech painter
- Luděk Mikloško - Czech football goalkeeper
- Luděk Munzar - Czech director, author and actor
- Luděk Nekuda - Czech moderator and musician
- Luděk Sobota - Czech actor
