= Johnny Jordan (rugby league) =

English rugby league footballer (1906–1957)

Personal information
- Full name: Aloysius John Jordan
- Born: first ¼ 1906 York, England
- Died: third ¼ 1957 (aged 51) York, England

Playing information
Club
Years	Team	Pld	T	G	FG	P
	Hull Kingston Rovers
1930–34	York	55	10			30
	Total	55	10	0	0	30
- As of 5 February 2015

Aloysius John "Johnny" Jordan (birth registered first ¼ 1906 – death registered third ¼ 1957) was an English professional rugby league footballer who played in the 1930s. He played at club level for York.

== Background ==
Johnny Jordan's birth was registered in York district, Yorkshire, he was the landlord of the Spread Eagle pub at 98 Walmgate, York, he was working for Rowntree's in York when he suffered a stroke that killed him, and his death aged 51 was registered in York district, Yorkshire.

It was reported in The Press on 13 July 2013 that Johnny Jordan's 1930–31 Challenge Cup runner-up medal had been misplaced when his wife Elizabeth (née Johnson) had taken the medal to The Blue Bell pub, 53 Fossgate, York, following Johnny Jordan's death in 1957. His son John C. Jordan, born in 1931 (age 93–94) was trying to locate the medal for his son Christopher J. Jordan (birth registered during fourth ¼ 1965 (age 59–60) in Buckrose district).

== Club career ==
Jordan began his professional career with Hull Kingston Rovers. He transferred to his hometown club York in 1930.

Jordan made his début for York on Saturday 25 October 1930, in York's progress to the 1930–31 Challenge Cup Final during the 1930–31 season, he scored tries in the second-round match against Huddersfield, third-round match against Salford, and the semi-final match against Warrington, a strain prevented him appearing in the 8–22 defeat by Halifax Final at Wembley Stadium, London on Saturday 2 May 1931, however he was awarded a runner-up medal, his last game for York was on Wednesday 14 March 1934.

== Genealogical information ==
Johnny Jordan's marriage to Elizabeth Johnson was registered during third ¼ 1928 in York district.

== Note ==
According to the FreeBMD, Johnny Jordan's forename is registered as 'Aloysious', i.e. with an 'o', on the birth, and death indexes, but as 'Aloysius', i.e. without an 'o', on the marriage index.
