= Alojzy Lysko =

Silesian writer and politician (1942–2026)

member of Sejm 2005-2007
- In office 25 September 2005 – 2007

Personal details
- Born: 15 February 1942 Boischow, Gau Upper Silesia, Germany
- Died: September 2026 (aged 84)
- Party: Law and Justice

Alojzy Wiktor Lysko (15 February 1942 – 22 September 2026) was a Polish Silesian writer and politician. He was elected to the Sejm on 25 September 2005, getting 6581 votes in 31 Katowice district as a candidate from the Law and Justice list.

During World War II Alojzy Lysko's father was forced into the Wehrmacht. Lysko, a famous Silesian activist, collected narratives from these forgotten soldiers with the hope of getting closer to his father. He wrote the book To byli nasi ojcowie: legendy rodzinne z Górnego Śląska o poległych żołnierzach Wehrmachtu, Bojszowy 1999.

His death at the age of 84 was announced on 22 September 2026.

== See also ==
- Members of Polish Sejm 2005–2007
