= Lewis Jones (Australian footballer) =

Australian rules footballer

Personal information
- Full name: Lewis Alfred Jones
- Born: 20 December 1883; St Kilda, Victoria
- Died: 7 July 1960 (aged 76); South Melbourne, Victoria

Playing career^{1}
Years	Club	Games (Goals)
1904	St Kilda	1 (0)
- ^{1} Playing statistics correct to the end of 1904.

Lewis Alfred Jones (20 December 1883 – 7 July 1960) was an Australian rules footballer who played with St Kilda in the Victorian Football League (VFL).
