= Ludovicus =

Ludovicus or Ludowicus is a Latinized form of the Germanic masculine given name Hludwig ("Louis"). It has been used as a baptismal name in the Low Countries, especially in Belgium; bearers often use(d) Lodewijk or short forms like Lode, Lou, Louis, or Ludo in daily life. People with the name include:

Latinized name

- Ludovicus Blosius (Louis de Blois; 1506–1566), Belgian monk and mystical writer
- Ludovicus Cappellus (Louis Cappel; 1585–1658), French Protestant churchman and scholar
- Ludovicus Carrio Brugensis (Louis Carrion; 1547–1595), Flemish humanist and classical scholar
- Ludovicus Episcopius (Ludovicus de Bisschop; c.1520–1595), Flemish composer
- Ludovicus Finsonius (Louis Finson; c.1575–1617), Flemish Baroque painter
- Ludovicus Mamburgus (Louis Maimbourg; 1610–1686), French Jesuit and historian
- Ludovicus Molinaeus (Lewis Du Moulin; 1606–1680), French Huguenot physician and controversialist in England
- Ludovicus Nonnius (Luis Nuñez; 1553–1645), Flemish physician and humanist
- Ludovicus Rabus (Ludwig Rab; 1523–1592), German Lutheran theologian
- Ludovicus a S. Carolo (Louis Jacob; 1608–1670), French Carmelite scholar, writer and bibliographer
- Ludovicus Sanctus (Lodewijk Heiligen; 1304–1361), Flemish Benedictine monk and music theorist
- Ludovicus Thomassinus (Louis Thomassin; 1619–1695), French theologian and Oratorian
- Ludovicus Tubero (1459–1527), Ragusan historian
- Ludovicus Casparus Valckenarius (Lodewijk Caspar Valckenaer; 1715–1785), Dutch classical scholar
- Ludovicus Vives (Luis Vives; 1493–1540), Valencian scholar and humanist in the Southern Netherlands

Adopted/monastic name

- Ludovicus Baba (ルイス馬場, died 1624), Japanese Franciscan missionary and saint
- Ludovicus de Beaumanoir, pseudonym of Louis Richeome (1544–1625), French Jesuit theologian and controversialist.
- Ludovicus Sasada (ルイス笹田, 1598–1624), Japanese Franciscan missionary and saint

Birth name

- Ludovicus F.J. "Louis" Ancot (1803–1836), Flemish pianist
- Ludovicus Henricus "Lode" Baekelmans (1879–1965), Belgian naturalist writer
- Ludovicus de Bisschop (c.1520–1595), Flemish composer
- P. Ludovicus "Louis" Brion (1782–1821), Belgian-Curaçaon officer, admiral for Venezuela and Colombia
- Ludovicus "Louis" de Dieu (1590–1642), Dutch Protestant minister and orientalist
- Ludovicus Makeblijde (1565–1630), Flemish Jesuit, poet and hymn writer
- Ludovicus Neefs (1617–c.1649), Flemish Baroque painter
- Ludovicus Jacobus "Lodewijk" Rogier (1894–1974), Dutch teacher and historian
- Ludovicus Schoenmaekers (born 1931), Belgian swimmer
- Ludovicus Stornebrink (1847–1941), Dutch-born Japanese businessman
- Ludovicus M. M. Van Iersel (1893–1987), Dutch-born Sergeant in the United States Army
- Ludovicus Carolus "Lode" Zielens (1901–1944), Belgian novelist and journalist
