= Alois Kříž =

Czech journalist and Nazi collaborator

- Born: 26 February 1911; Ottensen, German Empire
- Died: 26 March 1947 (aged 36); Pankrác Prison, Prague, Czechoslovakia
- Education: Charles University
- Occupation: Journalist
- Status: Executed by hanging
- Conviction: Treason
- Penalty: Death

Alois Kříž (26 February 1911 – 26 March 1947) was a Czech journalist and Nazi collaborator. He was accused of collaboration and hanged in March 1947.

== Biography ==
Alois Kříž was born in Ottensen in the German Empire (today a district of Hamburg) to Czech parents. After his father was conscripted into the Austro-Hungarian Army at the outbreak of World War I, Alois and his mother moved to Ledvice in Bohemia, where he completed primary school. Kříž then studied at a secondary school in Duchcov, and in 1929 he started studying law at Charles University in Prague; however, he never graduated.

In the aftermath of the German occupation of Czechoslovakia and the establishment of the Protectorate of Bohemia and Moravia in March 1939, Kříž embraced Nazism and started working as a journalist for the German occupiers. He was also a member of the fascist movement Vlajka, and a writer of antisemitic and pro-Nazi propaganda literature. In 1944, Kříž was made editor-in-chief of Czech radio by the occupying authorities.

At the beginning of the Prague uprising, Kříž was arrested by insurgents and after the end of World War II he was accused of collaboration with the Germans and subsequently sentenced to death by a people's court in Prague. He was hanged at Pankrác Prison in March 1947, together with fellow Nazi collaborators Rudolf Novák (of Arijský boj) and Antonín J. Kožíšek. Kříž's last words were: "Ať žije národ, ať zhyne bolševismus!" ("Long live the nation, may Bolshevism perish!")

== Bibliography ==
- Krev za novou Evropu (1940)
- Co víte o Židech? (1940)
