= Lou Rinaldi =

Lou Rinaldi may refer to:

- Lou Rinaldi (businessman) (born 1954), Uruguayan-American businessman
- Lou Rinaldi (politician) (born 1947), Canadian politician

== See also ==
- Luigi Rinaldi (1938–2023), Italian trade unionist and politician
