= Aloísio Magalhães =

Brazilian graphic designer (1927-1982)

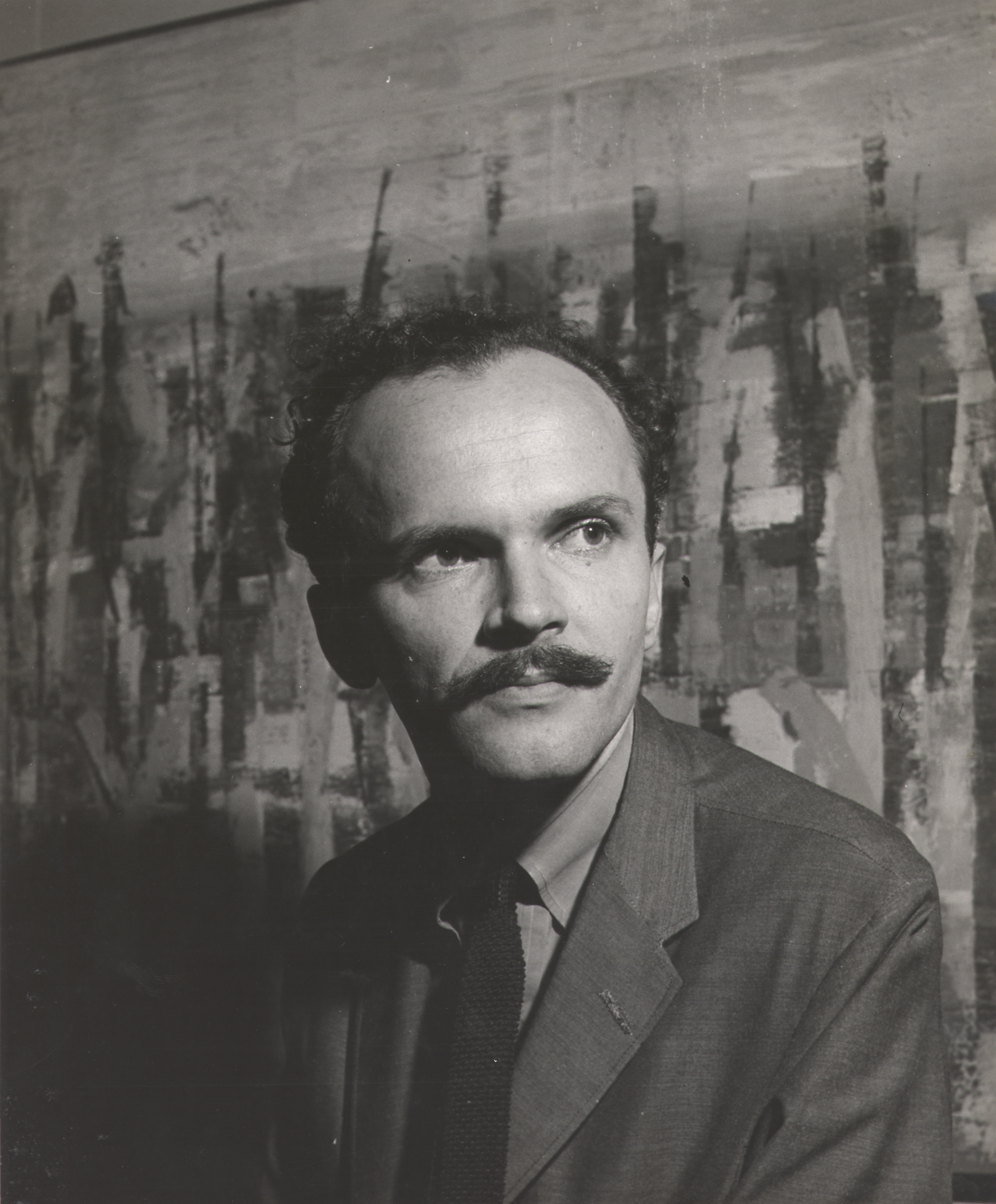
- Born: Aloísio Sérgio Barbosa de Magalhães; November 5, 1927; Recife, Brazil
- Died: June 13, 1982 (aged 54); Padua, Italy
- Occupation: Graphic designer

Aloísio Sérgio Barbosa de Magalhães (November 5, 1927 - June 13, 1982) was a Brazilian graphic designer. He is considered a pioneer in the introduction of modern design in Brazil, having helped found the first higher design institution in the country, entitled Industrial Design School of Rio de Janeiro (ESDI). After specializing in graphic design and visual communication in the United States, he taught at the Pennsylvania Academy of the Fine Arts in Philadelphia.

During the 1960s, he was responsible for creating the logo for Rio de Janeiro's IV Centennial, presented the first symbol for the television station Rede Globo, and was one of the country's representatives at the 1st International Biennial of Industrial Design at the Museum of Modern Art in Rio de Janeiro.

Aloísio Magalhães is also remembered for having participated in the contest organized by the Central Bank of Brazil, in 1966, in order to develop the graphic layout for the new banknote - the cruzeiro novo - in which he was the winner. Later, Aloísio Magalhães applied the mirroring of the images on the banknotes, so that they were practically identical no matter how they were turned over. This model was implemented in the 1000 cruzeiros banknote launched in 1978 and known as Baron, once it had the effigy of the Baron of Rio Branco on the obverse side. Afterwards, the same design pattern was implemented, with modifications, in the 100, 200, 500, 1000 and 5000 cruzeiros banknotes launched in 1981, which were the last banknotes Aloísio would develop during his lifetime.

November 5, the day Aloísio was born, is celebrated as the graphic designer's day in Brazil.

== Career ==
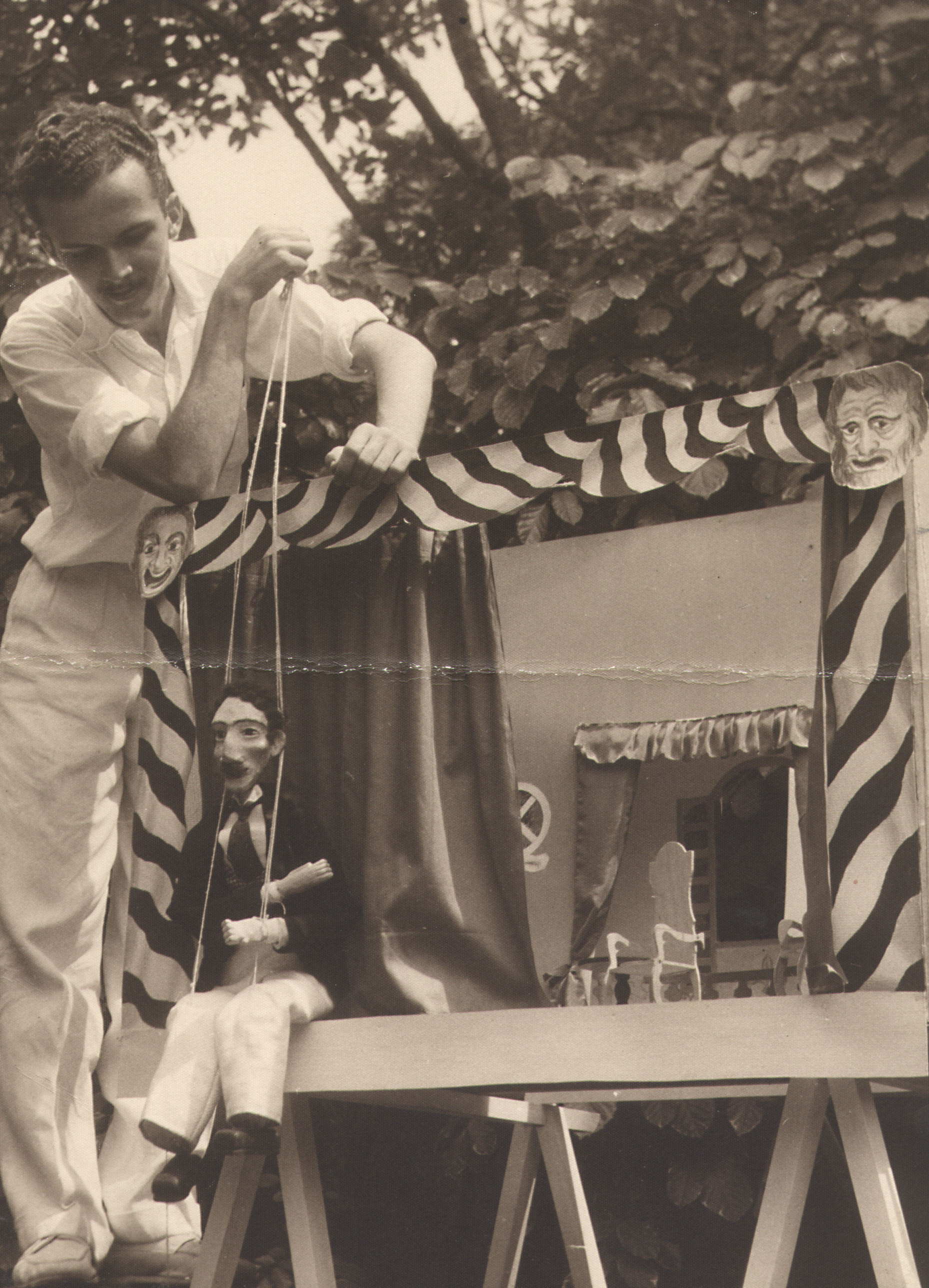
Aloísio Magalhães conducting a puppet at the Student Theater of Pernambuco in the early 1950s.

Born in Recife, Aloísio graduated in law school from the Federal University of Pernambuco (UFPE) in 1950, when he was working as a set designer and costume designer at, besides directing the puppets in the show. On a scholarship granted by the French government, he studied museology in Paris from 1951 to 1953, the same place where he attended Atelier 17, where he was a student of Stanley William Hayter. The following year, he returned to Recife to found the O Gráfico Amador, alongside Gastão de Holanda, Orlando da Costa Ferreira, and José Laurenio de Mello.

In 1956, he went to the United States to study graphic design and visual communication, when he published, along with Eugene Feldman, the books Doorway to Portuguese and Doorway to Brasília, as well as teaching at the Pennsylvania Academy of the Fine Arts. Four years later, he got back to Brazil to create an office specialized in the area he studied, doing projects for private companies and public agencies. In 1963, he was involved in the creation of the Industrial Design School (ESDI), in Rio de Janeiro, the first higher school of design in Brazil, where he taught classes on the subject. The following year, he was responsible for developing the logo for Rio de Janeiro's IV Centennial, a job that had repercussions in the public arena, as well as developing the symbol for the São Paulo Biennial Foundation.

In 1965, he developed the first symbol for the Brazilian television channel Rede Globo. Three years later, he was invited to be one of the country's representatives at the 1st International Biennial of Industrial Design, at the Museum of Modern Art in Rio de Janeiro. In the early 1970s, when he was a member of the Brazilian Association of Industrial Design (ABDI), he represented Brazil at the 1st Biennial of Design, Printmaking and Industrial Design in Cali, Colombia.

Aloísio coordinated the project at the National Center of Cultural Reference (CNRC), and was a member of the Council of Culture of the Federal District from 1975 to 1980. A year earlier, in 1979, Aloísio Magalhães was appointed director of the National Institute of Historic and Artistic Heritage (IPHAN) and two years later, secretary of culture in the Ministry of Education and Culture. During the early 1980s, he campaigned for the preservation of the Brazilian heritage as president of the National Pro-Memory Foundation.

=== Central Bank Notes ===
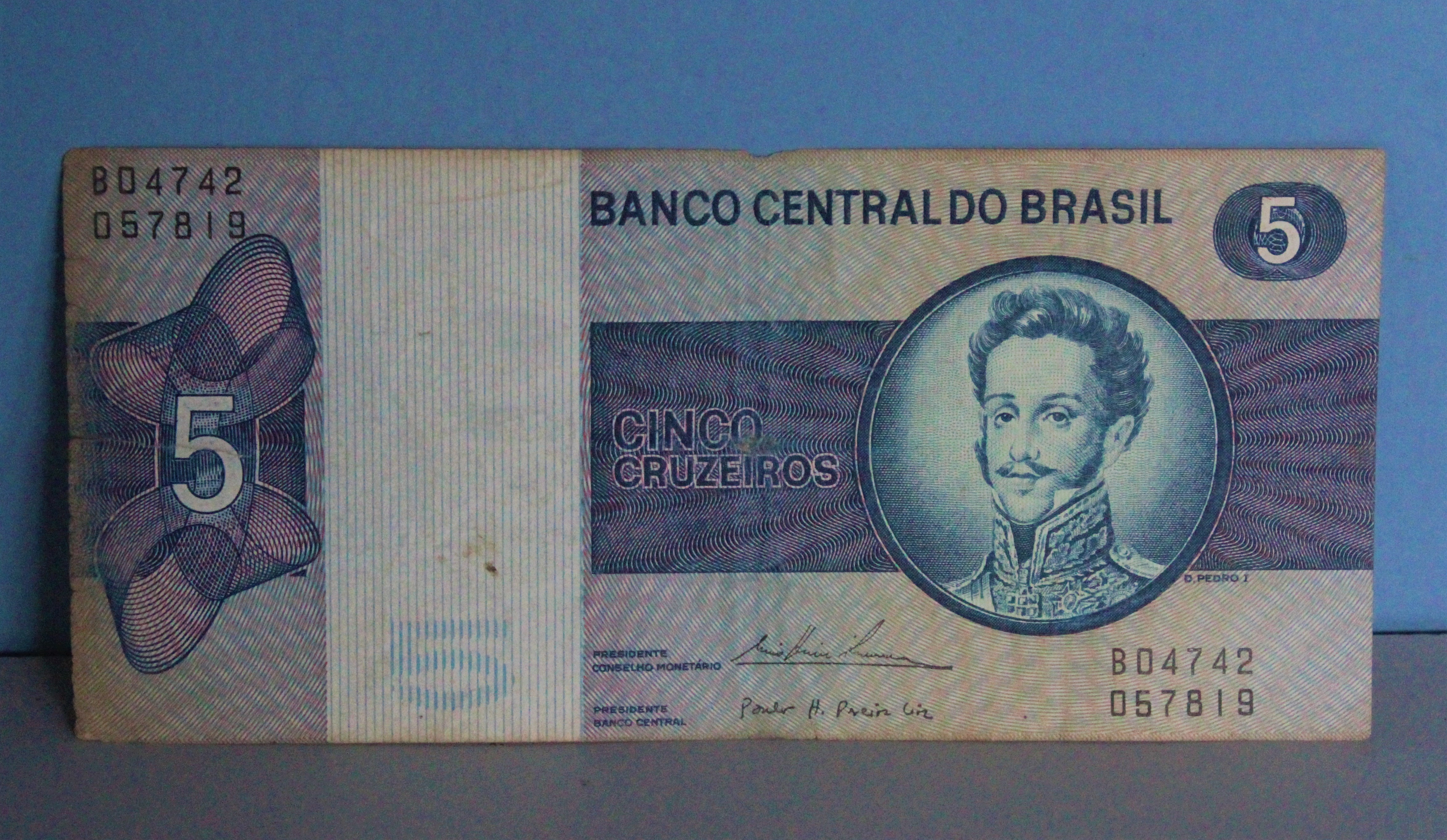
Cruzeiro novo banknote, made by Aloisio.

In 1966, Aloísio Magalhães participated in a contest organized by the Central Bank of Brazil to develop the graphic layout and the monetary standard of the new Brazilian banknotes (cruzeiro novo starting that year), in which he was the winner. The moiré pattern was a highly praised work as a source of innovation, since reticular misalignment usually generates an effect that is difficult to reproduce. Later, when redesigning the currency, he innovated again. According to Aloísio, the great difficulty was to know that the banknote has sides above and below so that the value could be recognized, that is, regardless of the position, the banknote would have the same visualization. Based on this application, he proposed mirroring in the notes; except for the coins, which did not have this similarity between top and bottom.

== Exhibitions ==
From 1953 to 1977, individual and collective exhibitions were held regarding Aloísio Magalhães' work in graphic design.

=== Solo exhibitions ===
- 1953 - Department of Education and Culture (Recife, Brazil);
- 1954 - Landscapes of Pernambuco at the Museum of Modern Art (São Paulo, Brazil);
- 1956 - Museum of Modern Art (São Paulo, Brazil);
- 1956 - Pan American Union (Washington, USA);
- 1957 - Roland de Aenlle Gallery (New York City, USA);
- 1958 - Painting and graphic art, at the Museum of Modern Art (Rio de Janeiro, Brazil);
- 1958 - Oxumarê Gallery (Salvador, Brazil);
- 1959 - The Print Club of Philadelphia (Philadelphia, USA);
- 1959 - Roland de Aenlle Gallery (New York, USA);
- 1961 - Petite Galerie (Rio de Janeiro, Brazil);
- 1966 - Exhibition on the symbol of the 4th Centennial of Rio de Janeiro at the Technische Hochschule of the university (Stuttgart, Germany);
- 1972 - Cartoons at School of Fine Arts (Belo Horizonte, Brazil);
- 1972 - Artwork at the Museum of Modern Art (Rio de Janeiro, Brazil);
- 1972 - Artwork at the Sugar Museum (Recife, Brazil);
- 1973 - Watercolors and lithographs, at Lotus Gallery (Recife, Brazil);
- 1973 - Cartoons at the Museum of Modern Art (São Paulo, Brazil);
- 1974 - Lithographs, watercolors and cartoons, at Galeria da Praça (Rio de Janeiro, Brazil);
- 1974 - Ministry of Education and Culture (Rio de Janeiro, Brazil);
- 1974 - Museum of Modern Art of São Paulo (São Paulo, Brazil);
- 1977 - Cartoons at Fischback Gallery (New York, USA)

=== Group exhibitions ===
- 1953 - 2nd São Paulo International Biennial, at the Museum of Modern Art (São Paulo, Brazil);
- 1954 - Pernambuco State Salon (Recife, Brazil);
- 1955 - 3rd São Paulo International Biennial, at Museum of Modern Art (São Paulo, Brazil);
- 1955 - 4th National Modern Art Salon (Rio de Janeiro, Brazil);
- 1956 - 50 Years of Brazilian Landscape, at the Museum of Modern Art (São Paulo, Brazil);
- 1958 - 5th International Biennial of Contemporary Lithography in Color, at Cincinnati Art Museum (Cincinnati, USA)
- 1958 - Recent Acquisitions of the Collection, at Museum of Modern Art (New York, USA);
- 1959 - 5th International Biennial of São Paulo, at the Museum of Modern Art (São Paulo, Brazil);
- 1959 - Brazilian Modern Art in Europe (Munich, Germany)
- 1960 - 30th Venice Biennial (Venice, Italy)
- 1961 - 6th International Biennial of São Paulo at the Museum of Modern Art (São Paulo, Brazil);
- 1971 - 1st American Biennial of Graphic Arts at La Tertulia Museum (Cali, Colombia)
- 1972 - 29th Salao Paranaense, at Guaíra Theater (Curitiba, Brazil);
- 1972 - Arte/Brazil/Hoje: 50 years later, at Collectio Gallery (São Paulo, Brazil);
- 1974 - 6th Panorama of Current Brazilian Art, at Museum of Modern Art (São Paulo, Brazil);
- 1976 - The Young Drawing of the 40's, at Pinacoteca do Estado (São Paulo, Brazil);

== Awards ==
Aloísio Magalhães was also awarded for his outstanding work in graphic design.

- 3 Gold Medals from the Art Directors Club of Philadelphia;
- 1st prize in the contest for the symbol of the Rio de Janeiro's IV Centennial;
- 1st prize for the choice of the symbol of the São Paulo Biennial Foundation;
- 1st prize in the contest for the adoption of a new line of the Cruzeiro Novo circulating medium banknote;
- 1st prize in the contest for the adoption of a new symbol for Light;
- Honorable mention as participant in the competition for the integrated architecture/design for the Brazilian pavilion in Osaka, Japan;
- Selection of the book Landseer, among the ten best works published in the biennium 1971/72, at the Biennial Art Book Festival/Museum of Jerusalem;

== Death and legacy ==
Aloísio Magalhães died in Padua, Italy, on June 13, 1982, after suffering a stroke while taking office as head of the meeting of Latin American Ministers of Culture.

In 1982, he was honored with a museum in his name, previously called Metropolitan Gallery of Art of Recife, and renamed Metropolitan Gallery of Art Aloisio Magalhaes. However, it was changed to Aloisio Magalhães Museum of Modern Art (MAMAM) in 1997.

In 1998, President Fernando Henrique Cardoso (FHC) issued Decree 7,508 to define November 5 as "National Design Day", in honor of the day Aloísio Magalhães was born and for having been the pioneer of graphic design in Brazil.

== See also ==
- History of graphic design
