= Luiz =

Luiz is a Portuguese name and an alternative form of Luís. It is archaic in Portugal and common in Brazil. Notable examples include:

- Luiz (footballer, born 1983), Luiz Silva Filho, Brazilian football goalkeeper
- Luiz Adriano (born 1987), Brazilian football striker
- Luiz Alberto (footballer, born 1982) (born 1982), Brazilian football centre-back
- Luiz Alberto de Araújo (born 1987), Brazilian decathlete
- Luiz Avellar (born 1956), Brazilian piano player
- Luiz Bonfá (1922–2001), Brazilian guitarist and composer
- Luíz Carlos (footballer, born 1985) (born 1985), Brazilian football defensive midfielder
- Luiz Alberto Figueiredo (born 1955), Brazilian diplomat
- Luiz Alfredo Garcia-Roza (1936–2020), Brazilian professor and novelist
- Luiz Flávio Gomes (1957–2020), Brazilian jurist and politician
- Luiz Eduardo Greenhalgh (born 1948), Brazilian politician
- Luiz Gustavo (born 1987), Brazilian football defensive midfielder
- Luiz Altamir Melo (born 1996), Brazilian swimmer
- Luiz Alberto da Silva Oliveira (born 1977), Brazilian football centre-back
- Luiz A. Rocha, Brazilian ichthyologist
- Luiz Felipe Scolari (born 1948), Brazilian football manager and former defender
- Luiz Inácio Lula da Silva (born 1945), Brazilian politician and 35th president of Brazil
- Luiz Phellype (born 1993), Brazilian football forward
- David Luiz (born 1987), Brazilian football centre-back
- Douglas Luiz (born 1988), Brazilian football midfielder
- Pedro Luiz (born 1996), Brazilian politician

== See also ==
- Luis
