= Ludovic Lebart =

French statistician (born 1942)

Ludovic Lebart (born 1942) is a French statistician. He is a senior researcher at the Centre National de la Recherche Scientifique and a professor at the Ecole Nationale Supérieure des Télécommunications in Paris. His research interests are the exploratory analysis of qualitative and textual data. He has coauthored several books on descriptive multivariate statistics, survey methodology, and exploratory analysis of textual data. He was a part of a research group in France led by Jean-Paul Benzécri that made significant contributions to the development of correspondence analysis.

== Main publications (in English) ==
- L. Lebart, A. Morineau, and K. Warwick (Elisabeth Moraillon Berry, trans.), Multivariate Descriptive Statistical Analysis: Correspondence Analysis and Related Techniques for Large Matrices, New York: John Wiley and sons, 1984.
- L. Lebart, A. Salem, and L. Berry, Exploring Textual Data, Dordrecht, Boston: Kluwer Academic Publisher, 1998.
- L. Lebart, Chapter 7: "Validation Techniques in Multiple Correspondence Analysis". In M. Greenacre and J. Blasius, eds., Multiple Correspondence Analysis and Related Techniques, Chapman and Hall/CRC, 2006, pp. 179–196.
- L. Lebart, "Validation technique in Text Mining". In : Spiros Sirmakessis (ed.), Text Mining and its Application, Berlin, Heidelberg: Springer Verlag, 2004, pp. 169–178
- L. Lebart, Chapter 8: "Complementary use of Correspondence Analysis and Cluster Analysis". In M. Greenacre and J. Blasius, eds, Correspondence Analysis in Social Sciences, London: Academic Press, 1994.
