= Aloyzas Stasiulevičius =

Lithuanian painter, art teacher, and critic

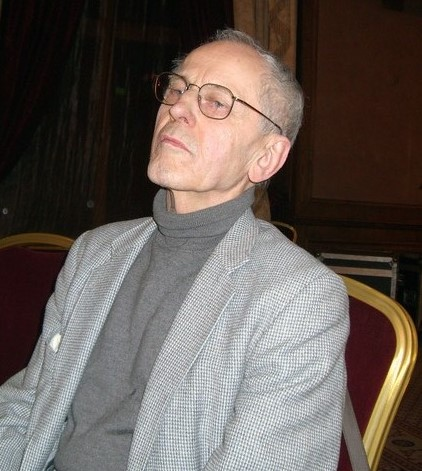

Aloyzas Stasiulevičius (born June 2, 1931 in Ariogala) is a Lithuanian modern painter, art teacher and critic. He lives and works in Vilnius. His works are held by various museums and galleries, including Jane Voorhees Zimmerli Art Museum, Ludwig Forum für Internationale Kunst, Tretyakov Gallery, Sharjah Art Museum, Latvian National Museum of Art, Lithuanian Art Museum. In 2007, he was awarded the Order for Merits to Lithuania.

From 1950 to 1956, Stasiulevičius studied painting at the Vilnius Academy of Art. After the graduation he worked as an art teacher in Telšiai (1956–1960), National M. K. Čiurlionis School of Art (1960–1976), Vilnius Academy of Art (1976–1979), Klaipėda University (2004–2006). Since 1957, he held more than 50 personal exhibitions and represented Lithuania in numerous international exhibitions.

During the times of Lithuanian SSR Stasiulevičius challenged the norms of socialist realism and was the first in Lithuania to create collages. His works are often monochromatic, but Stasiulevičius mixes colors to obtain subtle shades and variations. For several years he created works only in white. He frequently depicts abstract urban landscape of Vilnius and its Old Town; only a few of his works feature people. Since early 2000s, Stasiulevičius also creates Christianity-inspired works, often depicting crucified Jesus.
