= Lowie =

Lowie is a surname and a given name. Notable people with the name include:

== Surname ==
- Jules Lowie (1913–1960), Belgian racing cyclist
- Robert Lowie (1883–1957), Austrian-born American anthropologist
- Wander Lowie (born 1959), Dutch linguist

== Given name ==
- Lowie Stuer (born 1995), Belgian volleyball player
- Lowie Vermeersch (born 1974), Flemish automobile designer
- Lowie van Zundert (born 1998), Dutch footballer
