= Luigi Aloisio Riccio =

Luigi Aloisio Riccio was a Sicilian Bishop in the Roman Catholic Church. He was one of two (the other being Edward Fitzgerald) to vote against the doctrine of papal infallibility, which received 533 votes in support, in the 1870 First Vatican Council.

== Personal Details ==
Riccio was born in Naples on 28 October 1817, was ordained a priest on 5 June 1841, became Bishop of Monopoli in 1859, and of Caiazzo in 1860, serving in the latter capacity until his death on 9 November 1873, at the age of 56 years.
