= Alois Berla =

Austrian stage actor and writer (1826–1896)

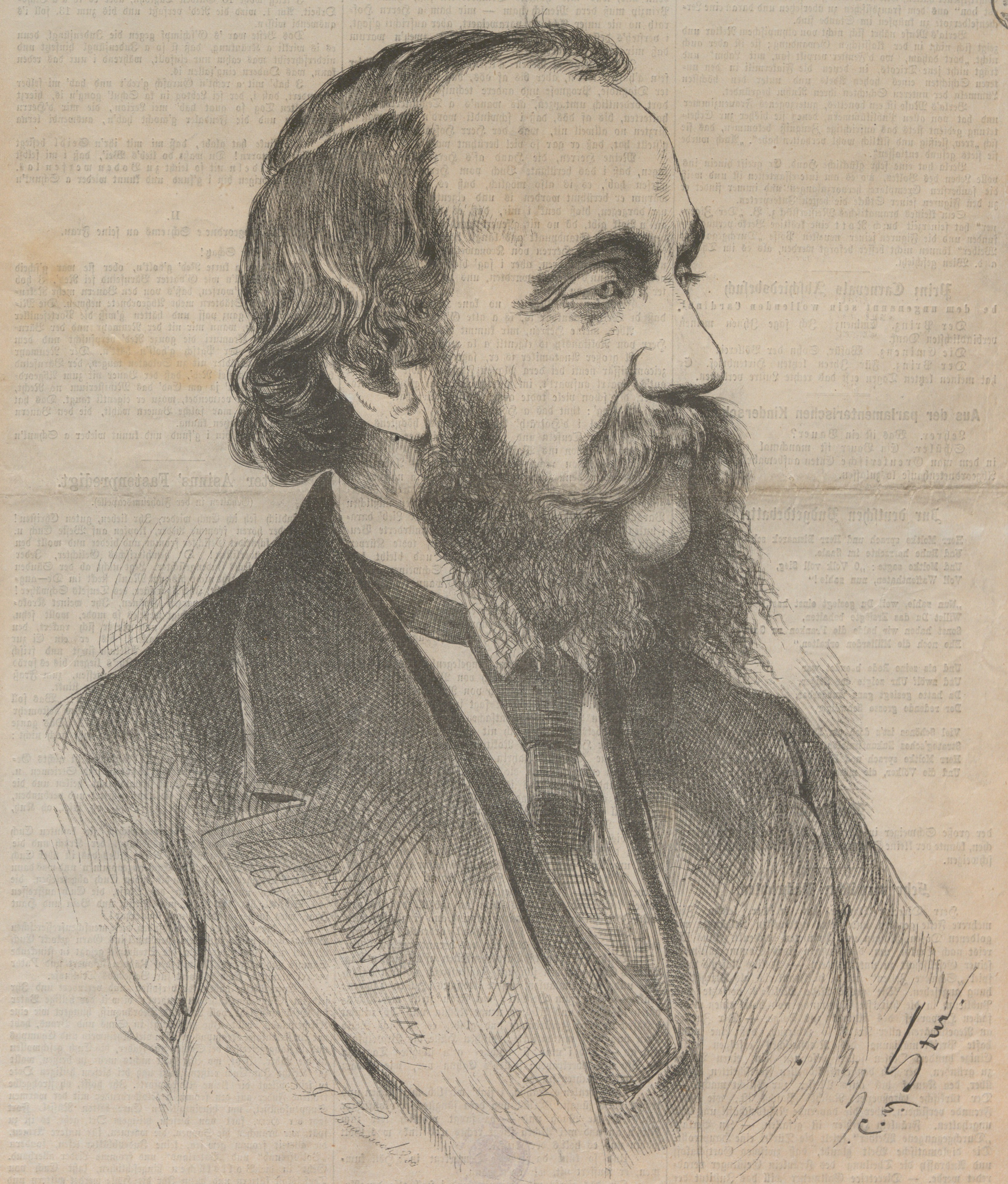
Berla in the title page of Der Floh, 1874

Alois Berla (7 March 1826 – 16 February 1896) was an Austrian actor and playwright.

He was born in Vienna, and was trained to be a musician; he became an actor, his stage debut being in the German Theatre, Pest in Hungary in 1847, in his own play Der letzte Zopf. The play was successful, and he was engaged as a playwright and actor in the Theater an der Wien in Vienna, appearing there from 1848. He wrote and translated a large number of plays in the genre of Old Viennese Folk Theatre; he is said to have written more than 130 works. Music for these was composed by Adolf Müller, Franz von Suppé, Anton M. Storch and Carl Millöcker.
