= Jean Louis Gobbaerts =

Belgian concert pianist, piano teacher and composer

Jean Louis Gobbaerts (28 September 1835 – 5 May 1886) was a Belgian Romantic era concert pianist, piano teacher, and composer. Popular and successful in his own day, Gobbaerts published over 1200 piano compositions. Gobbaerts published his piano compositions using the nom de plume Streabbog (Gobbaerts spelled backwards), sometimes also using the names Ludovic or Levi instead of Louis. No longer famous as a concert pianist today, he is now best known as the composer Streabbog.

== Life ==
Gobbaerts was born in Antwerp. He was a pupil of the Brussels Conservatory. He spent much of his career working as a pianist and a piano teacher in Brussels. He died at the age of 50 in Saint-Gilles, near Brussels.
