= Alajos =

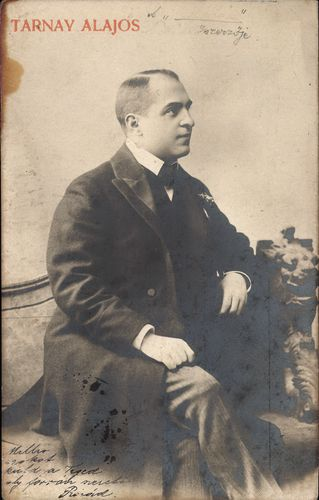
Alajos Tarnay (1870--1933) classical pianist, accompanist, composer

Alajos is a masculine given name. Notable people with the name include:

- Alajos Degré (1819–1896), Hungarian lawyer and writer
- Alajos Drávecz (1866–1915), Slovenian ethnologist and writer
- Alajos Hauszmann (1847–1926), Austro-Hungarian architect and scholar
- Alajos Károlyi (1825–1889), Austro-Hungarian diplomat
- Alajos Kenyery (1892–1955), Hungarian freestyle swimmer
- Alajos Keserű (1905–1965), Hungarian water polo player
- Alajos Stróbl (1856–1926), Hungarian sculptor and artist
- Alajos Szokolyi or Alajos Szokoly (1871–1932), Hungarian athlete and physician
