= Ludovic O'Followell =

French writer and doctor (1872–1965)

Ludovic O'Followell (born 1872 in Portslade - 29 January 1965) was a French medical doctor and writer. He is best known for his work demonstrating the effects of corsets on the shape of the rib cage with X-rays. Following the publication of Le Corset in 1905 and 1908, he encouraged a less severe design of corset and wrote a regular column for the corsetier magazine Les Dessous.

== Publications ==
- Le Corset (1905)
- Le sérum marin (impr. Alcan-Lévy, 1906)
- Le Corset (1908)
- Des Punitions Chez Les Enfants
- Pauvres veuves, pauvres malades, pauvres vieux... (Arrault, 1936)
- L'humour et les humoristes. Largentière: Imprimerie E. Majel. 1938. Accessible in full text on NordNum.
- La Vie manquée de Félix Arvers (Humbert, 1947)
- Déshabillez-vous ... ou soixante ans de la vie d'un médecin, Largentière: Humbert et Fils, 1951.
- En levant les yeux, A. Fauvel, 1955

== See also ==
- Corset
- X-ray
