= Lewis G. Longsworth =

Lewis Gibson Longsworth (November 16, 1904 – August 8, 1981) was an American chemist and biochemist. The New York Times said that his research "helped to make modern biochemistry possible". Longsworth was notable for creating separation methods that allowed to measure trace quantities of biological chemicals, as well as for new methods and improved techniques for studying the structures of proteins. Longsworth was a member of the National Academy of Sciences and a professor at Rockefeller University. He was also a member of the American Chemical Society, Electrochemical Society, Harvey Society, and Sigma Xi. He was the recipient of the 1968 American Chemical Society Award in Chromatography and Electrophoresis.

== Life and career ==
Longsworth was born in Somerset, Kentucky. He graduated from Southwestern College in 1925. Longsworth received his Ph.D. degree from the University of Kansas in 1928 and spent his career of 42 year at the Rockefeller Institute.
