= Ludovic Paratte =

Swiss footballer (born 1992)

Personal information
- Full name: Ludovic Paratte
- Date of birth: 1 February 1992 (age 34)
- Place of birth: Geneva, Switzerland
- Height: 1.74 m (5 ft 9 in)
- Position: Midfielder

Team information
- Current team: FC Veyrier Sports
- Number: 18

Youth career
- –2005: Veyrier Sports
- 2005–2011: Servette

Senior career*
Years	Team	Apps	(Gls)
2011–2014	Servette	3	(0)
2013	→ Fribourg (loan)	11	(1)
2013–2014	→ Nyon (loan)	14	(0)
2014–2015	Meyrin	13	(0)
2015–2016	FC Champel		
2016–2018	MDA Foot	45	(5)
2018–	FC Veyrier Sports	37	(8)
- * Club domestic league appearances and goals as of 2 November 2019

Ludovic Paratte (born 1 February 1992) is a Swiss footballer who plays for FC Veyrier Sports.
