= Aloísio Teixeira Garcia =

Brazilian academic and politician (1944–2024)

Member of the Legislative Assembly of Minas Gerais
- In office 1 February 1987 – 31 January 1991

Personal details
- Born: 27 April 1944; Lavras, Minas Gerais, Brazil
- Died: 19 May 2024 (aged 80); Belo Horizonte, Minas Gerais, Brazil
- Political party: PMDB
- Education: Federal University of Minas Gerais
- Occupation: Academic

Aloísio Teixeira Garcia (27 April 1944 – 19 May 2024) was a Brazilian academic and politician. A member of the Brazilian Democratic Movement Party, he served in the Legislative Assembly of Minas Gerais from 1987 to 1991.

Garcia died in Belo Horizonte on 19 May 2024, at the age of 80.
