= Aloys Pennarini =

Austrian opera singer

Alois Pennarini

Aloys Pennarini, also spelled Alois Pennarini (born Aloys Federler; 21 June 1870 – 23 June 1927), was an Austrian opera singer. First a Spinto tenor, then a heldentenor, he later became an opera director and film actor.

He was born in Wiener Neudorf, Austria-Hungary. His teachers were Joseph Gansbacher and Johannes Ress in Vienna.

== Singing career ==
- Debut 1893 City Theatre Bratislava as Turiddu in Cavalleria Rusticana (Mascagni)
- 1895–1896 City Theatre Olomouc
- 1896–1897 City Theatre Elberfeld
- 1898–1900 City Theatre Graz, now in Wagner roles
- 1900–1913 Hamburg Theatre
- 1904 Savage Opera Company in North America: Parsifal tour

Tour to London Covent Garden Opera, Amsterdam and Haag, also Philadelphia, United States, Chestnut Street Opera House

- 1905–1908 He made recordings for ODEON-Platten (Hamburg)

== Directing career ==
- 1913–1920 director from the Staatstheater Nürnberg in Nuremberg, also as a singer
- 1920 director of F. X. Šalda Theatre in Liberec in Czechoslovakia

== Acting career ==
He performed in the German silent film Banditen (1920–21), directed by Max Agerty and produced by Singing film GmbH, Berlin. Pennarini portrayed Santanello, the head of the bandits. He performed the role of Heinrich Heine in the silent film Heinrich Heines Erste Liebe, directed by Eva Christa and released on 25 January 1922, by Vera Filmwerke AG, Hamburg. He was also in Mabel Und Ihre Freier, a silent film directed by Eva Christa released on 26 August 1922, by Vera Filmwerke AG, Hamburg.

== Personal ==
Pennarini was once married to the soprano Ella Appelt (Gabriella), with whom he had a son named Anton. Pennarini married Clary Antoniette Nisser on 19 May 1909, and they had four children: Heinz, Toni-Juliana, Isolde and Mathias.

He married Paula Weidenslaufer and moved with her to Liberec, Czechoslovakia, where he died on 23 June 1927.
