= Pedro Luiz =

Brazilian politician (born 1996)

Member of the Legislative Assembly of Minas Gerais
- Incumbent
- Assumed office 1 February 2027

Personal details
- Born: 26 February 1996 (age 30)
- Party: Liberal Party

Pedro Luiz da Silva (born 26 February 1996) is a Brazilian politician who was elected member of the Legislative Assembly of Minas Gerais in 2026. He has been a municipal councillor of Contagem since 2025.
