= Clovis Renaison =

Clovis Renaison (born 24 October 1892 in Le Moule, Guadeloupe; died 14 November 1989 in Les Abymes) was a politician from Guadeloupe who served in the French Senate from 1946-1948 .
