= Alois P. Swoboda =

American bodybuilder and writer

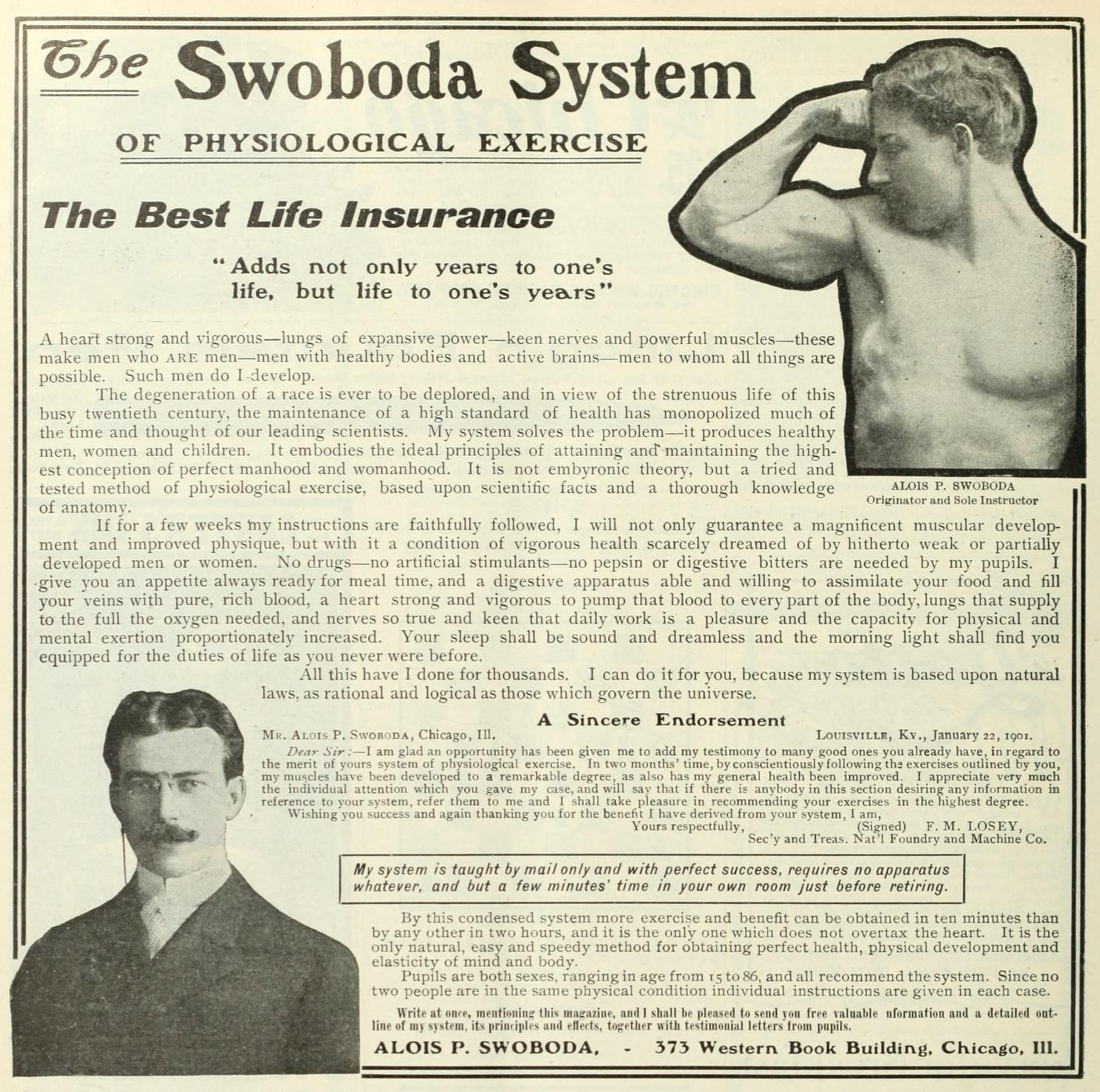
Advertisement for the Swoboda system

Alois P. Swoboda (1873–1938) was an American quack and physical culture mail-order instructor. Swoboda claimed that his exercise system combined with drinking four pints of water a day would cure almost any illness.

== Biography ==
Swoboda was born in Vienna on March 8, 1873, and immigrated to the U.S. in 1881 with his father, Adolf Swoboda. They settled in Omaha, Nebraska, where he quickly found work in the local bathhouses. Swoboda subsequently worked in Omaha meatpacking factories but did not receive medical training, etc., despite insinuations of a formal education.

== Conscious evolution ==
Swoboda throughout his career advertised his pseudoscientific ideas under the names "System of Physiological Exercise", "Swoboda's System" and "Conscious Evolution". He described conscious evolution as "based upon a discovery in the cells of the body which I made, and which has revolutionized the effect of exercise."

His mail order advertisements promised to cure practically all diseases. He argued that his system was the only natural method for obtaining health as it rejuvenates cells, organs and tissue in the body. He also advertised his system as restoring youth, no matter the age. His exercise course did not use apparatus or exercise equipment. He charged $20 for his complete course which consisted of six tension exercise lessons, such as flexing the forearm. He also promised his readers that they have the guarantee of United States government that his system works. This false statement was later dropped.

Swoboda managed to dupe Woodrow Wilson into using his exercise system during 1901 and 1902. Swoboda's system was advertised in Harper's Weekly, Pearson's Magazine and Popular Mechanics.

The Journal of the American Medical Association, noted in 1918:

In brief, the case against the so-called Swoboda System may be summed up by saying that "Conscious Evolution" is a meaningless phrase whose apparent use is to obtain money by misleading and deceiving the public, that the Swoboda exercises are new or original; that the entire Swoboda scheme is quackery of the "physical culture" type.

== Oil stocks and religion ==
From an article in Time magazine:

Alois P. Swoboda, mass-advertising "culture rhythm" man, was enjoined in Brooklyn from selling oil stock to members of his cult by a letter describing one "Dahlgran," alleged oil well locater. Eighteen months ago, Dr. Swoboda took in $70,000 for the stock; no oil has yet appeared. Said the letter: "This man Dahlgran through his power is to serve Swoboda and Swobodians. Dahlgran has located for me what he considers a very extensive oil pool ... and is positive that the first well will be an enormous gusher. ... I personally do not care for wealth for my own sake, but merely to aid Swobodians."

No oil was found.

One of Swoboda's most enthusiastic backers was Elbert Hubbard, claimed as an "uncle" by L. Ron Hubbard, the latter of whom turned many of Swoboda's teachings into what is now Scientology.
