= Loe =

Loe or LOE may refer to:

- Level of effort
- Levels of evidence
- Living on Earth, a weekly news program distributed by Public Radio International
- Loei Airport, IATA code
- Kakazai, or Loe, a Pashtun tribe

== People ==
=== Given name ===
- Loe of Maui, semi-legendary king of Maui
- Loe de Jong (1914–2005), Dutch historian
- Loe Thai, king of the Sukhothai Kingdom 1298–1323
- Loe van Belle (born 2002), Dutch cyclist

=== Surname ===
- Erlend Loe (born 1969), Norwegian novelist
- Judy Loe (1947–2025), English actress
- Kameron Loe (born 1981), American baseball pitcher
- Olivia Loe (born 1992), New Zealand rower
- Raoul Loé (born 1989), French footballer
- Richard Loe (born 1960), New Zealand rugby union footballer
- Robert Loe (born 1991), New Zealand basketball player
- Walter von Loë (1828–1908), Prussian soldier and aristocrat
- William Loe (1575–1645), English Anglican priest and writer

== Places ==
- Loe, Estonia, village in Estonia
- The Loe, freshwater lake in Cornwall, England
