= Luděk Krayzel =

Czech ice hockey centre

- Born: January 14, 1975 (age 50); Ostrava, Czechoslovakia
- Height: 6 ft 1 in (185 cm)
- Weight: 203 lb (92 kg; 14 st 7 lb)
- Position: Centre
- Shot: Left
- Played for: HC Vítkovice; SaiPa; HC Vsetín; HKm Zvolen; HC Košice; Brûleurs de Loups
- Playing career: 1992–2015

Luděk Krayzel (born January 14, 1975) is a Czech former professional ice hockey centre.

Krayzel played in the Czech Extraliga for HC Vítkovice and HC Vsetín. He also played in the SM-liiga for SaiPa, the Tipsport Liga for HKm Zvolen and HC Košice and the Ligue Magnus for Brûleurs de Loups. He finished his career in July 2015 after spending four seasons with HC RT Torax Poruba of the Czech 2. Liga

== Career statistics ==
			Regular season					Playoffs
Season	Team	League	GP	G	A	Pts	PIM	GP	G	A	Pts	PIM
1992–93	TJ Vitkovice	Czechoslovakia	5	0	2	2	0	—	—	—	—	—
1993–94	HC Vitkovice	Czech	2	0	0	0	0	—	—	—	—	—
1994–95	HC Havirov	Czech2	26	7	8	15	48	—	—	—	—	—
1995–96	HC Vitkovice	Czech	31	4	5	9	26	4	0	0	0	4
1996–97	HC Vitkovice	Czech	42	14	10	24	40	9	4	3	7	49
1997–98	HC Vitkovice	Czech	41	14	24	38	42	11	5	4	9	14
1998–99	HC Vitkovice	Czech	26	3	4	7	74	4	1	1	2	2
1999–00	HC Vitkovice	Czech	52	17	14	31	70	—	—	—	—	—
2000–01	SaiPa	SM-liiga	30	6	11	17	38	—	—	—	—	—
2000–01	HC Slovnaft Vsetín	Czech	17	5	8	13	4	14	0	2	2	22
2001–02	HC Vitkovice	Czech	11	2	3	5	55	—	—	—	—	—
2001–02	HKM Zvolen	Slovak	26	7	10	17	20	—	—	—	—	—
2002–03	HC Vitkovice	Czech	45	10	11	21	81	6	0	1	1	6
2003–04	HC Vitkovice	Czech	22	6	12	18	28	6	3	1	4	10
2004–05	HC Vitkovice	Czech	22	1	4	5	18	—	—	—	—	—
2004–05	HC Košice	Slovak	11	2	4	6	6	10	1	0	1	6
2005–06	HC Košice	Slovak	44	4	19	23	22	8	0	4	4	12
2006–07	HKM Zvolen	Slovak	46	9	21	30	60	10	3	2	5	16
2007–08	HKM Zvolen	Slovak	54	14	23	37	60	6	3	2	5	12
2008–09	Brûleurs de Loups	France	25	8	21	29	30	11	2	9	11	14
2009–10	Brest Albatros Hockey	France2	18	9	22	31	18	6	2	7	9	4
2010–11	Brûleurs de Loups	France	21	11	9	20	20	2	1	1	2	2
2011–12	HC RT TORAX Poruba 2011	Czech3	38	19	13	32	74	—	—	—	—	—
2012–13	HC RT TORAX Poruba 2011	Czech3	39	10	13	23	99	7	1	3	4	36
2013–14	HC RT TORAX Poruba 2011	Czech3	36	17	24	41	40	9	3	5	8	8
2014–15	HC RT TORAX Poruba 2011	Czech3	29	15	24	39	82	8	1	6	7	8
Czech totals			311	76	95	171	438	54	13	12	25	107
Slovak totals			181	36	77	113	168	34	7	8	15	46
