= Luis Bezeta =

Spanish visual artist (born 1976)

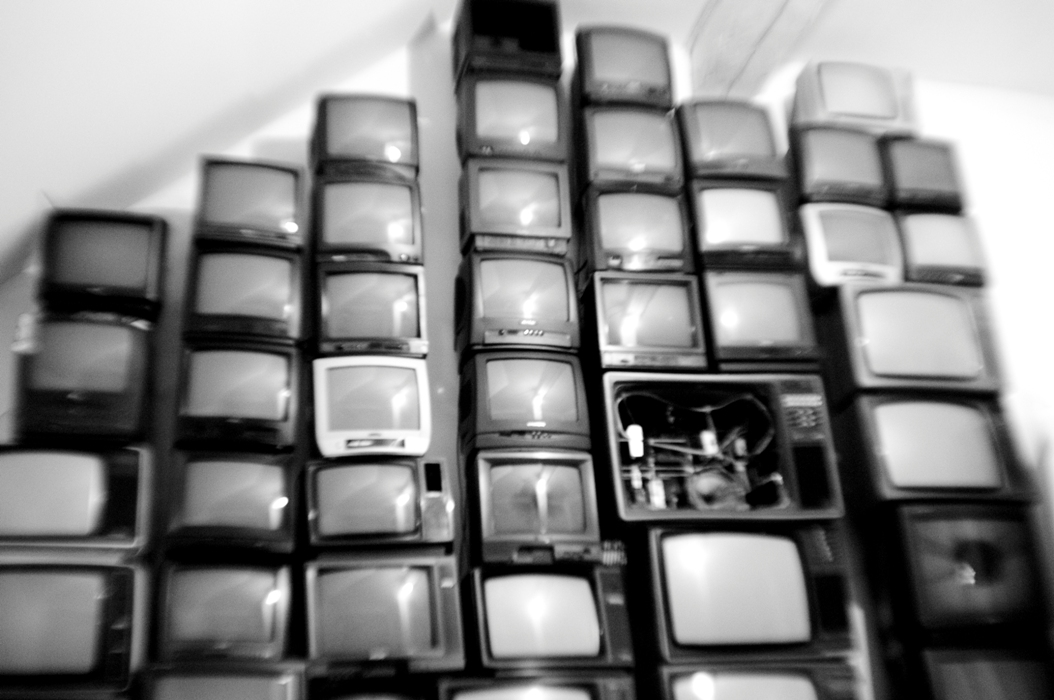
- Demolden Video Project, Santander
- Born: 12 April 1976; Santander, Spain
- Education: University of Berlin
- Known for: Video art, performance, installation art

Luis Bezeta (Luis Bourgon Zubieta, 12 April 1976) is a Spanish visual artist and filmmaker.

He studied Physics at the University of Cantabria. Later in 2001, he traveled to Germany, where he continued studying Theoretical Physics at the FU Berlin. Then in 2006, finished the Advanced Course Direction and Production Film-Video-TV in IDEP, Barcelona.

Fascinated by the silent films of Buster Keaton and Méliès, he entered the Institute of Audiovisual Sciences in Berlin in 2001 and in 2006 performed the Course of mounting the School of Cinema and Audiovisual of Catalonia (ESCAC).

In his youth, he explored various disciplines, including theatre and short or animated films, but he soon focused on video art.

He is an expert in auto shooting and in performer with fictional characters played by the same.

In 2011 the Museum of Modern and Contemporary Art of Santander and Cantabria MeBas space opens and organizes its first major exhibition individual. La Capella de Barcelona Production in turn organized in 2014 a solo exhibition entitled 'Es una escena en la que yo mismo actúo'.

It has been part of numerous solo and group exhibitions both nationally and internationally. In his pieces use different visual and auditory procedures such as video, photography, drawing or performance.

He is the founder and creator of the spaces Pandemolden Laboratory of Art and Demolden Video Project.

== Works ==
- Untitled (1999)
- Madurodam (2000)
- Imagine (2001) (emission Televisión Española)
- Suchen (2002) (emission Televisión Española)
- My mate Paul (2003)
- Muñecas (2004) (installation)
- Autorretrato cubista (2005) (installation)
- Oh my love (2006) (installation)
- Dish washer (2006) (installation)
- Ocasión (2007)
- Piolin (2008)
- La fiesta de la cereza (2009)
- Hombre jarrón (2010) (emission Televisión Española)
- Berlin Remixed (2011) (documentary)
- Norma Jeane es Marilyn (2011) (installation)
- East west (2011)
- azul/rosa (2012)
- The factory (2013)
- Video-film (2014) (installation)
- Es una escena en la que yo mismo actúo (2014)
- La élite del poder (2014) (documentary)
- Mass media (2015)
- Studio (2015)
- Videodisco (2016)
- MKYC (2016) (film)
- Vorprofil (2017)
- Bassxpander (2018)
- El principio de la cinematicidad (2019) (film)
- Paper tiger (2020)

== Exhibitions ==
- Postcontemporánea. Arte Contemporáneo. Grupo Cadena Media TV (Spain) (2021)
- Plataforma Audiovisual. Area de Cultura de la Diputación de Barcelona (Spain) (2020)
- Barcelona Producció. La Capella|25 Años. Barcelona (Spain) (2019)
- XX Bienal Internacional de Arte de Cerveira (Portugal) (2018)
- 7mo Festival Internacional de Videoarte de Camagüey (Cuba) (2017)
- VideoBardo 20 Years International Videopoetry Festival (Argentina) (2016)
- VideoSpain, Centro Cultural España en Lima (Perú) (2015)
- Cel·AV | Vídeo a Konvent, Berguedà, Barcelona (2015)
- La Capella, BCN Producció, Barcelona (2014)
- 12, Demolden Video Project, Santander (2013)
- Rencontres Internationales, Kulturhaus, Berlin (Deutchsland) (2012)
- La cuestión del paradigma, Centro de Arte La Panera, Lleida (2011)
- Norma Jeane es Marilyn, Museo de Bellas Artes, Santander (2011)
- Dune, Espacio Menosuno, Festival Proyector Video Arte, Madrid (2011)
- 9 Edición Proyecto Circo, Bienal de La Habana (Cuba) (2010)
- Vivimos del aire, Galeria Del Sol St., Santander (2010)
- Fifteen, Edge Zones, Miami (USA) (2009)
- Vivimos del aire, Escuela de Arte Pedro Almodóvar, Ciudad Real (2009)
- Virtual Box, Galería Metropolitana, Feria Video Loop, Barcelona (2008)
- Dordrecht, El Observatorio del Arte, Foco Norte, Santander (2008)
- Noches de Videoarte, Espacio Escala, Caja Sol, Sevilla (2007)
- Korea Art Fair, KIAF, Galeria Metropolitana de Barcelona (Korea) (2007)
- Festival de Photo et Video de Biarritz. Biarritz (France) (2006)
- LOOP 06, Stand Galeria Metropolitana Barcelona. Barcelona (2006)
- El Cuarto Oscuro, My Name´s Lolita Art Gallery, Madrid (2006)
- Kornhausforum - Hangar. Bern (Suitzerland) (2005)
- Sala Tecla, Salón de jóvenes creadores de Europa. Barcelona (2005)
- 49 Salon Européen des jeunes createurs Montrouge. Paris (France) (2005)
- Ars Sublimis, Orensanz Museum, New York (USA) (2004)
- Shortinvenice, Bienal de Venecia. Venezia (Italy) (2004)
- Galería Pablo Hojas, Kitsch & Chic. Santander (2004)
- Museo do Mar de Vigo, "Olladas oceánicas". Vigo (2003)
- Saatchi & Saatchi, PHotoEspaña VI. Madrid (2003)
- Centre Cívic Sant Andreu, Cuando me acerco... Barcelona (2003)
- Laboratorio de arte Pandemolden, Back to Berlin. Santander (2003)
- Universidad de Cantabria, Luis Bezeta. Santander (2002)
- Festival de Cine de Medina del Campo, Spain (2002)
- Festival Internacional Cinema Fantástico de Sitges, Spain (2002)
- Centro Cultural Doctor Madrazo, Santander (2001)

== Collections ==
His works are part of important public and private collections, among which include the Museum of Modern and Contemporary Art of Santander and Cantabria, the CajaSol Foundation and the Valencian Institute of Modern Art, IVAM.

== Honours and awards ==
- 2019 Plataforma Audiovisual. Area de Cultura de la Diputación de Barcelona (Spain)
- 2017 Finalist Grand IndieWise Convention, Miami (EEUU)
- 2016 Nominated for Blooom Award by Warsteiner, Cologne (Germany)
- 2014 BCN Producció, La Capella, Barcelona
- 2014 Premios Anuaria 'Mejor cubierta de un libro', Premio Nacional Diseño
- 2013 Grant production audiovisual, Gobierno de Cantabria
- 2012 First Prize Video Art and Performance, 6 Premio Arte Laguna, Venecia (Italy)
- 2012 Grant Prize of Artes Plásticas, Gobierno de Cantabria
- 2011 Prize videocreation Madatac, Metrópolis, TVE
- 2009 First prize Video Creation EiTB, Bilbao Arte, Bilbao
- 2006 Art Grant, IUA-Phonos, Barcelona
- 2005 Residence Artist Grant, Hangar. Barcelona
- 2004 Grand Prix, 49 Salon Europeen jeunes createurs. Paris (France)
- 2003 Prize, II Premio de Artes Plásticas de Cantabria
- 2003 First Prize Videocreación Pancho Cossio. Santander
- 2003 Special Mention Festival Envideo. Cáceres
- 2002 First Prize Miquel Casablancas. Barcelona
- 2002 First Prize IX Festival de Ciudad Real
- 2002 First Prize III Festival Audiovisual de Majadahonda. Madrid
- 2002 First Prize Videocreation IX Festival Suel-R. Fuengirola

== Publications ==
- Los Ángeles Todos (Santander, 2012, ISBN 978-84-615-9238-8)
- El laberinto del complejo de culpabilidad (Santander, 2014, ISBN 978-84-616-9504-1)
- Flechas de rayo (Santander, 2015, ISBN 978-84-944078-0-2)
- Estallo sino (Santander, 2016, ISBN 978-84-944078-1-9)
- El principio de la cinematicidad (Barcelona, 2017, ISBN 978-84-168759-8-6)
- Aliasing EP Astral Copper (Santander, 2016, Demolden Video Project)
- Nyquist Criterion LP Astral Copper (Santander, 2021, Demolden Video Project, ASIN B099NM9ZM6)
