= VinFast Ludo =

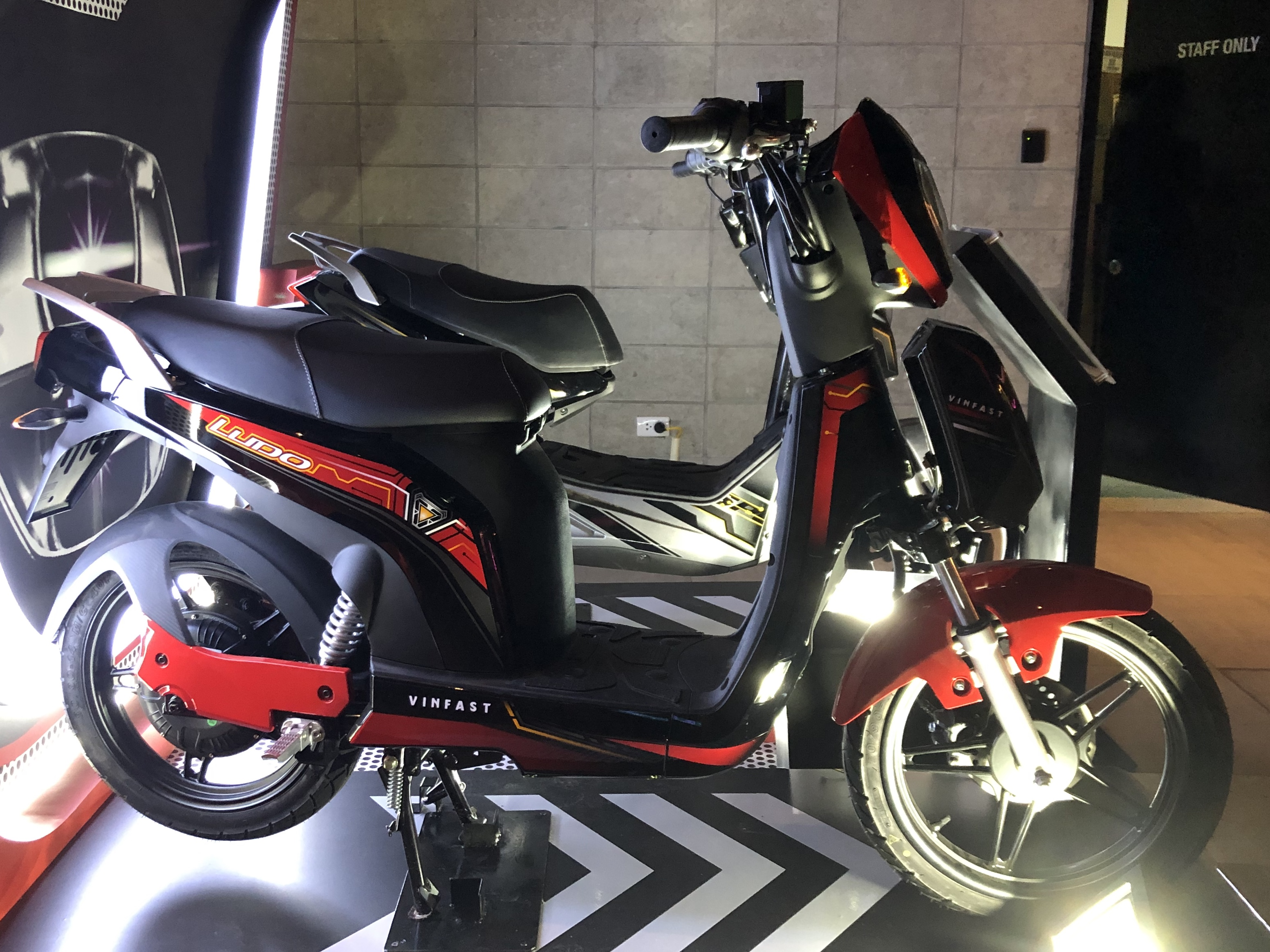
- VinFast Ludo electric motorbike in a CGV theater, Times City
- Manufacturer: VinFast
- Parent company: Vingroup
- Production: 2019
- Assembly: Vietnam
- Predecessor: VinFast Klara
- Class: E-Scooter
- Engine: Bosch integrated in rim
- Power: 500 W
- Torque: 60 Nm
- Brakes: Disc brake front, brake drum brake rear
- Tires: Tubeless rubber tires
- Wheelbase: 1.157 mm
- Dimensions: L: 1.699 mm W: 715 mm H: 1.070 mm
- Seat height: NA
- Weight: 68 kg (battery) weight 140 kg (dry)

The VinFast Ludo is one of two electric scooters VinFast Production and Trading Co., Ltd. designed, developed, produced and launched on 12 September 2019, continuing the line of electric scooters, alongside the VinFast Klara 2018. The name Ludo comes from the Latin ludo, meaning "I play - Player". Along with the Impes, the Ludo is aimed at high school students, but mostly high school.

On 1 June 2020, VinFast announced that the selling price of LG Chem-VinFast lithium-ion batteries (for VinFast Klara S, Impes and Ludo electric motorcycles) is VND 6,600,000 in June 2020, from July 2020 is 8.600.000 VND.
