= Clovis High School =

There are multiple schools named Clovis High School in the United States, including:

- Clovis High School (California), Clovis, California
- Clovis High School (New Mexico), Clovis, New Mexico
