= Ludo (given name) =

Ludo is a given name, common as a Flemish name. It can be a short form of Ludovic, Ludovicus, Luděk, Ľudovít, Ludwig, and related names.

== People with the name ==
- Ludo Campbell-Reid, New Zealand urban planner
- Ludo Coeck (1955–1988), Belgian footballer
- Ludo De Keulenaer (born 1960), Belgian racing cyclist
- Ludo De Witte (born 1956), Belgian writer
- Ludo Delcroix (born 1950), Belgian racing cyclist
- Ludo Dielis (born 1945), Belgian carom billiards player
- Ludo Dierckxsens (1964–2025), Belgian racing cyclist
- Ludo Frijns (born 1957), Belgian racing cyclist
- Ludo Graham (born 1961), British television producer and director
- Ludo Moritz Hartmann (1865–1924), Austrian historian, diplomat and politician
- Ludo Lacroix (born 1972), French motor racing engineer
- Ludo Lefebvre (born 1971), French chef, restaurateur and television personality
- Ľudo Lehen (1925–2014), Slovak painter and chess problem composer
- Ludo Loos (1955–2019), Belgian racing cyclist
- Ludo Martens (1946–2011), Belgian Communist political activist
- Ludo Mikloško (born 1961), Czech football goalkeeper.
- Ľudo Ondrejov (1901–1962), Slovak poet and prose writer
- Ludo Peeters (born 1953), Belgian racing cyclist
- Ludo Philippaerts (born 1963), Belgian show jumping rider
- Ludo Poppe, Belgian television producer
- Ludo Rocher (1926–2016), Belgian-born American Sanskrit scholar
- Ludo Stuart (fl.1923–30), Scottish rugby player
- Ludo Troch, Belgian film editor
- Ludo Van der Heyden (born 1950s), Belgian management scholar

== Fictional characters with the name ==
- Ludo Bagman, a character from Harry Potter and the Goblet of Fire by J. K. Rowling
- Ludo, a character from the 1986 film Labyrinth
- Ludo, the primary antagonist of the Disney animated television series Star vs. the Forces of Evil
