= Clovis Municipal School District =

School district in New Mexico, United States

Clovis Municipal School District, also known as Clovis Municipal Schools, is a school district in Clovis, New Mexico, United States.

The district includes Clovis and Cannon Air Force Base.

== History ==
At least two parents in Clovis were arrested in 1999 on truancy-related charges after their teenage children repeatedly missed school.

Terry Myers became the superintendent in 2010. He was formerly the superintendent of Mount Pleasant Independent School District. In 2012 the board of trustees continued the term of the superintendent. In recent years the district has seen a sharp decline in the number of students enrolled causing several elementary schools and one middle school to be shut down or repurposed. The High School has a strong tradition in Football with over 10 state titles and is currently led by Stan Hodges, who in first season went 0-10. The team plays their home games at Eric Roanhaus Field at Leon Williams Stadium. The field is named after former coach Eric Roanhaus who during his tenure from 1978-2016 would win 10 state championships and 343 wins, which is the record in the state of New Mexico.

== Schools ==
=== Elementary schools ===
- Arts Academy at Bella Vista

Grades K-5th

- Barry STEAM Academy

Grades K-5th

- Cameo Elementary School(Closed after 23-24 school year)
- Highland Elementary School

Grades K-5th

- James Bickley Elementary School

Grades K-5th

- La Casita Elementary School
  - By 2006 it housed a bilingual English-Spanish program; most of the bilingual English-Spanish teachers in the district were employed by this school that year. Plans called for, by 2013, for all parts of the school to be English-Spanish bilingual.

Grades K-5th

- Lockwood Elementary School (Closed after 23-24 school year) Now Lockwood Early Childhood Center
- Mesa Elementary School

Grades K-5th

- Parkview Elementary School

Grades K-5th

- Ranchvale Elementary School (Closed after 15-16 school year)
- Sandia Elementary School

Grades K-5th

- Zia Elementary School

Grades K-5th

=== Middle schools ===
- Marshall Middle School stopped serving 7th and 8th grade after 22-23 school year

Now Marshall 6th Grade Academy Grades 6th

- Yucca Middle School

Grades 7th-8th

- W.D. Gattis Middle School

Grades 7th-8th

=== High schools ===
- Clovis High School

Grades 10th-12th

- Clovis High School Freshman Academy (Closing independent campus after 2024-25 school year and moving onto Clovis High Schools Campus, will still operate as its own school)

=== Other ===
- Lincoln Jackson iAcademy (The iAcademy is moving into the old Freshmen campus after the 2024-25 school year)
- Los Niños Early Intervention Center (Closed after 23-24 school year)
- Lockwood Early Childhood Center
