= Alojz =

Alojz is a given name. Notable people with the name include:

- Alojz Ajdič (born 1939), Slovenian composer, author of many orchestral works
- Alojz Fandel, former Slovak football player and coach
- Alojz Geržinič (1915–2008), Slovenian composer
- Alojz Gradnik (1882–1967), Slovene poet and translator
- Alojz Ipavec, also written as Lojze Ipavic (1815–1849), Slovenian composer
- Alojz Knafelc, Slovenian mountaineer and the inventor of the Slovenian trail blaze
- Alojz Rebula (1924–2018), Slovene writer, playwright, essayist and translator
- Alojz Rigele (1879–1940), sculptor from Bratislava
- Alojz Tkáč (1934–2023), the first archbishop of the Košice Episcopal see (1995–2010)
- Alojz Rakús (1947–2023), Slovak politician, Minister of Health (1990–1992), MP (1990–1992, 1998–2002)
- Alojz Uran or Alojzij Uran (1945–2020), Slovenian prelate of the Roman Catholic Church
