= Luis Miranda Casañas =

Puerto Rican businessman (1937–2019)

Luis Miranda Casañas (October 1937 – January 7, 2019), a native of Santana barrio, in Arecibo, Puerto Rico, was the Chairman of the Board of Universal, the largest insurance group in Puerto Rico, which he founded in 1998. It also has a corporate presence on the United States mainland. He is credited, during his long career with Universal, as being the driving force behind the emporium's gradual but steady expansion into diverse lines of business and of successfully surviving banking's incursion into the insurance business.

== Career ==
A graduate of the University of Puerto Rico Río Piedras campus School of Business Administration, his professional career in the insurance business began in 1957 as an underwriting trainee. In 1959, he founded his own company, and in 1983 founded the Eastern America Insurance Agency, the cornerstone of the Universal Insurance Group, which in 2004 began its mainland United States expansion and now has operations in Arizona, California, Florida, Hawaii, Nevada, South Carolina and Texas, and had reached $1.4 billion in total assets by 2008. A leader of Puerto Rico's insurance industry, Miranda presided ACODESE, the insurance industry's trade group in 1985, 1990 and 1998.

Miranda was a member of the prestigious Caribbean Business Hall of Fame, and one of only 22 businessmen to obtain the annual Lifetime Achievement Award instituted in 1988. In 2007, the United States Hispanic Chamber of Commerce awarded him its Lifetime Achievement Award. On a personal level, he was a paso fino horse enthusiast.

== Death ==
He died on January 7, 2019, at the age of 81 leaving a wife and a daughter.

== Legacy ==
His daughter Monique Miranda-Merle founded the Luis Miranda Casañas Foundation and the "Universal University" with the purpose of supporting the insurance industry in Puerto Rico.
