= Aloysius =

Aloysius (/ˌæloʊˈɪʃəs/ AL-oh-ISH-əs) is a given name.

== Etymology ==
It is a Latinisation of the names Alois, Louis, Lewis, Luis, Luigi, Ludwig, and other cognates (traditionally in Medieval Latin as Ludovicus or Chlodovechus), ultimately from Frankish *Hlūdawīg, from Proto-Germanic *Hlūdawīgą ("famous battle"). In the US, the name is rare, with fewer than 0.001% of babies receiving the name since the 1940s. Most of those were Roman Catholics.

== People ==
- Aloysius (born 1963), Indonesian politician
- Aloysius Ambrozic (1930–2011), Roman Catholic cardinal
- Aloysius Bertrand (1807–1841), French Romantic poet, playwright, and journalist
- Tad Dorgan (1877–1929), Thomas Aloysius "Tad" Dorgan, American writer and cartoonist
- Aloysius Foster (1943–2025), American jazz drummer
- Aloysius Gonzaga (1568–1591), Italian aristocrat and saint
- Aloysius John Jordan (1906–1957), English rugby league footballer who played in the 1930s
- Aloisius Kangulu (born 1978), Namibian politician
- Aloysius Leo Knott (1829–1918), American politician, lawyer and educator
- Aloysius Lilius (1510–1576), Italian doctor, astronomer, philosopher and chronologist
- Aloysius Pang (1990–2019), Singaporean actor
- Aloysius Pieris (1934-2026), Sri Lankan Sinhala Jesuit priest
- Aloysius Schmitt (1909–1941), Roman Catholic priest
- Aloysius Stepinac (1898–1960), Yugoslav Croat prelate
- Aloysius Szymanski (1902–1956), given name for Baseball Hall of Famer Al Simmons
- Aloysius Paulus Maria van Gaal (born 1951), given name for Dutch football manager Louis van Gaal
- Aloysius John Wycisło (1908–2005), American prelate of the Roman Catholic Church who served as the eighth bishop of the Diocese of Green Bay
- James Aloysius Johnston (1874-1954), American politician and the first and longest-serving warden of Alcatraz Federal Penitentiary.

== Fictional characters ==
- Alo Creevey, in the UK television series Skins
- Aloysius “Al” Binewksi, carnival ringmaster and father of the protagonist in Geek Love.
- Aloysius T. McKeever, hobo squatter in the 1947 Christmas film It Happened on Fifth Avenue
- Aloysius Menlove, mayor of Schmigadoon, the fictional town in the television series Schmigadoon!.
- Aloysius O'Hare, villain of the 2012 film The Lorax
- Aloysius Parker, the chauffeur of Lady Penelope Creighton-Ward in the 1960s TV series Thunderbirds
- Aloysius Pendergast, protagonist of several novels by Douglas Preston and Lincoln Child
- Aloysius K. Randall, protagonist in the war film Wake Island.
- Aloysius Bartholamew Sam, better known as Yosemite Sam, a character in the Looney Tunes franchise
- Aloysius Samberly, a season 2 recurring character on the television series Agent Carter
- Aloysius Snuffleupagus (Mr. Snuffleupagus), on Sesame Street
- Aloysius (teddy bear), in Evelyn Waugh's 1945 novel Brideshead Revisited
- Sister Aloysius, in the play Doubt: A Parable and the film adaptation Doubt
- Aloysius, an anthropomorphic wolf in Highlights magazine features
- Aloysius Devandander Abercrombie, the self-described protagonist of the 1993 Primus song, “My Name is Mud”
- Doctor Aloysius James Animo, a mad scientist obsessed with genetic experiments on animals from the American animated series “Ben 10”
- Aloysius, the older cousin of Elias in “Elias, or The struggle with the nightingales”, by Maurice Gilliams
- Aloysius, the taxidermised cat belonging to Rhoda/Yoda in series 5, episode 6 ("Caravan of Courage") of Brassic
- Doctor Hunter Aloysius Percy, known as Hap in the series The OA
- Anthony Aloysius St John Hancock; Tony Hancock's fictional radio Persona

== Education ==
- St Aloysius' College
