= Lotan (disambiguation) =

Lotan or Litanu (Ugaritic: Ltn) was a Levantine sea monster who fought the god Baʿal and developed in Hebrew lore as Leviathan.

Lotan may also refer to:

- Lotan, Israel, a Kibbutz in southern Israel
- Lotan Baba or Mohan Das, Indian holy man promoting peace by rolling his body along the ground when he travels
- Lotan, son of Seir, a person named in the Bible
- Loton, a village in Naraingarh, Haryana, India

== Surname ==
- Jonah Lotan (born 1973), Israeli actor
- Nili Lotan, Israeli-American fashion designer

== See also ==
- Lota (name)
- Lotar (disambiguation)
