= Lotario =

Lotario may refer to:

- Lotario (Handel), opera seria by George Frideric Handel
- Lotario (given name), given name

== See also ==
- Lothar (disambiguation)
- Lothario
