= Lote =

Lote may refer to:

== Places ==
- Lote, Norway, a village in Eid municipality, Sogn og Fjordane, Norway
- Lote, India, an area in the Ratnagiri district of Maharashtra

== People ==
- Denis Kiwanuka Lote (1938–2022), Ugandan Roman Catholic prelate, Archbishop of the Roman Catholic Archdiocese of Tororo
- Ethel Lote (1920–2024), British World War II nurse and yoga instructor
- Lote Raikabula (born 1983), a New Zealand Rugby union player
- Lote Tuipulotu (born 1987), American professional rugby union player
- Lote Tuqiri (born 1979), former professional dual-code rugby footballer who primarily played as a winger across both codes
- Lote Tuqiri (rugby union, born 1987) (born 1987), Japan international rugby union sevens player
- Thomas Lote (MP fl. 1363), English politician and brewer
- Thomas Lote (MP fl. 1380–1390), English politician from Chippenham

== Other ==
- Lote tree (disambiguation)
- Lote language, an Austronesian language spoken around Cape Dampier in Papua New Guinea
- LOTE, a 2020 novel by Shola von Reinhold
- Languages Other Than English, LOTE is a frequently used acronym in Australia and New York
- Living on the Edge (disambiguation)

== See also ==
- Lota (name)
- Lotus (disambiguation)
- FK Ohrid Lote, a football club from the city of Ohrid, Macedonia
