= Thomas Lote =

Thomas Lote may refer to:

- Thomas Lote (MP fl. 1363)
- Thomas Lote (MP fl. 1380–1390)
- Thomas Lote (inventor), see Fire engine
