= Loa (disambiguation) =

Loa are the spirits of Haitian Vodou and Louisiana Voodoo.

Loa or Loas may also refer to:

== People ==
- Loa Ho (1894 – 1943), a Taiwanese poet
- Loa Nou (born 1987), a Papua New Guinean cricketer
- Loa Olafsson, a Danish athlete
- Pháp Loa (1284–1330), a Vietnamese Thiền Buddhist monk

== Fictional characters ==
- Loa (comics), a character in the Marvel Universe
- Loa (Fullmetal Alchemist), a character in the manga series Fullmetal Alchemist

== Zoology ==
- Loa (nematode), a genus of nematode worms
  - Loa loa, a roundworm
  - Loa loa filariasis, a disease caused by Loa loa
- Loa, a rarely used term for a butterflyfish taxon at least approximating genus Chaetodon
- Loa, Icelandic name for the European golden plover

== Places ==
- Spitzerberg Airport, in Lower Austria, Austria
- Loa, Burkina Faso
- Loa, Utah
- Loa River, Chile
- El Loa Province, Chile
- Louze, Pakistan (also spelled "Loas"), a village in Gilgit Baltistan, Pakistan

== Other uses ==
- Levels of Autonomy (LoA)
- Letters of assist
- Low Overhead Audio Stream, a feature in the Advanced Audio Coding specification
- Loa Nou, Papua New Guinean cricketer (born 1987)
- Loa, a ship in the Peruvian Navy
- Loa (Spanish play), an introductory theatrical piece
- Loa (Nephilim), a 1998 supplement for the role-playing game Nephilim

== See also ==
- LOA (disambiguation)
- Laos, a country in Asia
- Lota (name)
