= Loga =

Loga may refer to:

== People ==
- Bob Loga (1940–1996), American stock car racing official
- Hermann von Loga (1859-1911), Prussian politician
- Iarlaithe mac Loga, also known as Saint Jarlath
- Ignacy Loga-Sowiński (1914–1992), Polish trade union activist and politician
- Loga Ramin Torkian (born 1964), Iranian musician
- Paul Loga (born 1969), Cameroonian football player

== Places ==
- Loga, Leer, Germany
- Loga, Neschwitz, Germany
- Loga, Niger
- Loga, Norway
- Loga Park, Rostov, Russia

== Other ==
- loga, each of the 7 upper worlds (seven logas) in Ayyavazhi mythology

== See also ==
- Loka (disambiguation)
- Log (disambiguation)
