= Lothar (disambiguation) =

Lothar is a family name and a given name.

Lothar may also refer to:

- Lothar (storm), an extratropical cyclone that hit Central Europe in 1999
- Lothar (Metabarons), a fictional robot in Metabarons
- Lothar, Nepal
- Lothar I or Lothair I (795–855)
- Lothar, a fictional character and sidekick of Mandrake the Magician

== See also ==
- Lotar (disambiguation)
- The Cross of Lothair is sometimes called the "Cross of Lothar"
- Lothair (disambiguation)
- Chlothar, an earlier version of the above name Lothair (Lotharius)
- Lotharingia
- Lothario
- Luther (disambiguation)
- Lothar and the Hand People, a psychedelic musical group
- Lothar of the Hill People, a fictional character on Saturday Night Live
