= Lotar (name) =

Lotar is German, Norwegian, Polish, Hungarian and Swedish masculine given name that is a modern form of the Germanic Chlothar (which is a blended form of Hlūdaz and Harjaz). People with this name include:

== Surname ==
- Eli Lotar (originally Eliazar Lotar Theodorescu; 1905–1969), French and Romanian photographer and cinematographer

== Given name ==
- Lotar Olias (1913–1990), German composer
- Lotar Siewerdt (born 1939), Brazilian scientist
- Lotar Rădăceanu, alternate name of Lothar Rădăceanu, whose birthname was Lothar Würzer or Würzel (1899 – 1955), Romanian journalist, linguist, and politician

== Nickname/pseudonym/stage name ==
- Marina Lotar, professional name of Bellis Marina Hedman, (born 1944), Swedish actress

== See also ==
- Lotar (disambiguation)
- Lota (name)
- Lothar
