= Spranger =

Spranger is a name which may refer to:

- Bartholomeus Spranger (or Bartholomaeus) (1546–1611), a Flemish Mannerist painter and etcher
- Carl-Dieter Spranger (born 1939), a German politician
- Eduard Spranger (1882–1963), a German philosopher and psychologist
- John William Spranger (died 1822), a Royal Navy officer
- Lothar Spranger, an East German footballer
- Spranger Barry (1719–1777), an Irish actor
