= Loca =

Loca or LOCA may refer to:

== Arts and entertainment ==
- La Loca, Latin American female mythotype
- La Loca (opera), by Gian Carlo Menotti

=== Music ===
- Loca Records, an independent UK record label
- Loca (EP), an EP by Tomomi Itano

==== Songs ====
- "Loca", a 1922 tango by Manuel Jovés; see List of public domain tangos
- "Loca" (Álvaro Soler song), 2019
- "Loca" (Arsenium and Natalia Gordienko song), a 2007 Eurovision song
- "Loca" (Dana International song), 2013
- "Loca" (Honey Singh song), 2020
- "Loca" (Khea, Duki and Cazzu song), 2017
- "Loca" (Shakira song), 2010, based on "Loca Con Su Tiguere" by El Cata
- "Loca", a 2009 song by Aleks Syntek from Métodos de Placer Instantáneo
- "Loca", a 1997 song by Alejandra Guzmán from La Guzmán
- "Loca", a 2017 song by Maite Perroni
- "Loca", a 2012 song by Mariana Seoane from La Malquerida
- "La Loca", a 1993 song by grupera music group Los Fugitivos

== Other uses ==
- Lodi AVA (LoCA), an American Viticultural Area in the Central Valley of California
- Liquid optically clear adhesive, an adhesive used in display devices
- Loss-of-coolant accident, an accident scenario in nuclear reactors

== See also ==
- Loka (disambiguation)
