= Lothaire =

Lothaire is French masculine given name that is a modern form of the Germanic Chlothar (which is a blended form of Hlūdaz and Harjaz). People with this name include:

== Surname ==
- Hubert Lothaire (1865 – 1929), Belgian military officer

== Given name ==
- Lothaire Bluteau (born 1957), Canadian actor

== Nickname/pseudonym/stage name ==
- M. Lothaire pseudonym of a group of mathematicians
- Sophie Lothaire, stage name of Marguerite-Louise Odiot de Montroty, (1736–1801), French dancer, actress and director

== See also ==
- Lothair (disambiguation)
