= LOA =

LOA may stand for:

== Music ==
- Life of Agony, a New York hardcore/hard rock band
- Lights Out Asia, a Milwaukee, Wisconsin-based post-rock and ambient band
- Lords of Acid, a Belgian-American post-industrial/techno band
- "Love on Arrival," a song by country music singer Dan Seals

== Other ==
- Lake Oconee Academy, Georgia
- Law of attraction, a belief of New Thought movement
- Leave of absence, a period of time that one must be away from their primary job, while maintaining the status of employee.
- Level of assurance
- Length overall, the maximum length of a vessel's hull measured parallel to the waterline.
- Letter of Agency (also Letter of Authorization), a document authorizing a telecommunications provider to act on a consumer's behalf
- Letter of Authority, a legal document in South Africa for vehicle registration
- Library of America, an American publisher
- Lines of Action, an abstract-strategy game
- Left occipito-anterior, a cephalic presentation in childbirth
- Low-opioid anesthesia, a variant of, general anesthesia
- Limits of Agreement, a statistical measure used when comparing the degree of agreement among raters

== See also ==
- Loa (disambiguation)
