= Lothar =

Lothar is a Danish, Finnish, German, Norwegian, and Swedish masculine given name, while Lotár is a Hungarian masculine given name. Both names are modern forms of the Germanic Chlothar (which is a blended form of Hlūdaz, meaning "fame", and Harjaz, meaning "army"). Notable people with this name include:

== Surname ==
- Eli Lothar (more commonly "Lotar", born Eliazar Lotar Theodorescu; 1905–1969), French and Romanian photographer and cinematographer
- Ernst Lothar (1890–1974), Moravian-Austrian writer
- Hanns Lothar or Hanns Lothar Neutze (1929–1967), German actor
- Mark Lothar (1902–1985), German composer
- Rudolf Lothar (1865–1943), Hungarian-born Austrian writer
- Susanne Lothar (1960–2012), German actress

== Given name ==
- Lothar Ahrendt (born 1936), interior minister of the German Democratic Republic
- Lothar Albrich (1905–1978), Romanian hurdler
- Lothar Baier (1942–2004), German author
- Lothar Baumgarten (1944–2018), German artist
- Lothar Berg (1930–2015), German mathematician
- Lothar Berthold (1926–2007), German politician, historian and publisher
- Lothar Bolz (1903–1986), East German politician
- Lothar Brühne (1900–1958), German film score composer
- Lothar-Günther Buchheim (1918–2007), German author
- Lothar Collatz (1910–1990), German mathematician
- Lothar Dräger (1927–2016), German comic writer
- Lothar Emmerich (1941–2003), German football player and manager
- Lothar von Faber (1817–1896), German industrialist
- Lothar Forcart (1902–1990), Swiss zoologist
- Lothar Geisler (1936–2019), German football player
- Lothar Hause (born 1955), East German football player
- Lothar Kolditz (1929–2025), German chemist and politician
- Lothar Kreyssig, German bureaucrat and opposer of "Aktion T4"
- Lothar Kurbjuweit (born 1950), East German football player
- Lothar Lindtner (1917–2005), Norwegian actor
- Lothar Machtan (born 1949), German historian, writer
- Lothar de Maizière (born 1940), last Prime Minister of East Germany (1990)
- Lothar Malskat (1913–1988), German painter and art restorer
- Lothar Matthäus (born 1961), German football player and manager, 1990 World Cup winner
- Lothar Matthes (1947–2025), German diver
- Lothar Meggendorfer (1847–1925), German illustrator
- Lothar Meyer (1830–1895), German chemist
- Lothar Mendes (1894–1974), German screenwriter and film director
- Lothar Metz (1939–2021), German wrestler and Olympic medalist
- Lothar Milde (born 1934), East German athlete who competed mainly in the discus throw
- Lothar Müthel (1896–1964), German stage and film actor and director
- Lothar Osterburg (born 1961), German artist
- Lothar Rendulic (1887–1971), Austrian war criminal and army group commander in the Wehrmacht during World War II
- Lothar von Richthofen (1894–1922), fighter ace and younger brother of top-scoring ace Manfred von Richthofen (the Red Baron)
- Lothar Sippel (born 1965), German football player
- Lothar Späth (1937–2016), German politician
- Lothar Spranger, East German footballer
- Lothar von Trotha (1848–1920), German military commander who instigated the Herero massacre
- Lothar Ulsaß (1940–1999), German football player
- Lothar Wolleh (1930–1979), German photographer

== Fictional characters ==
- Lothar (Legends of Chima), a character in Legends of Chima
- Lothar – comic character, sidekick to Mandrake the Magician created by Lee Falk
- Lothar – a gatekeeper in the 2016 Indian film Mohenjo Daro
- Lothar – a Nazi spy for Germany, sidekick to Nazi spy Neville Sinclair in the Rocketeer
- Lothar – character in E. T. A. Hoffmann's The Sandman
- Lothar Weiser – a spy for Socialist East Germany in Arnaldur Indriðason's book, The Draining Lake
- Anduin Lothar – a historical warrior in the Warcraft Universe
- Lothar – a robot in The Metabarons
- Lothar – a powerful Planewalker wizard in the Planescape setting for Dungeons & Dragons, likewise appearing in the game Planescape: Torment
- Lothar of the Hill People – a character in an SNL skit played by Mike Myers

== See also ==
- Lothair
- Luther (disambiguation)
- Ludwig (disambiguation)
- Lotar (name)
- Louis
