= Lokam =

Lokam may refer to:

- Kotha Bangaru Lokam, a 2008 Indian Telugu-language film
- Maya Lokam, a 1945 Indian Telugu-language film
- Tava lokam, one of the Seven Logas/Lokas (Seven Upper Worlds) in Ayyavazhi mythology

== See also ==
- Loka (disambiguation)
