= Logar =

Logar may refer to:

- Logar Province, Afghanistan
- Logar River in Afghanistan
- Logar (surname), Slovene surname
- Logar Valley (Slovenia)

== See also ==
- Lotar (disambiguation)
