= Living on the Edge =

Living on the Edge may refer to:

== Film, television & radio ==
- Living on the Edge (film), a 2005 documentary by Rodrigue Jean
- Living on the Edge (British TV series), a 2007 British reality series
- Living on the Edge (Indian TV series), an Indian TV series about environmental issues
- "Living on the Edge", an episode of Disasters of the Century
- Living on the Edge, a religious radio show hosted by Chip Ingram

== Music ==
- Living on the Edge (Stéphane Pompougnac album), 2003, or the title song
- Living on the Edge (Dewey Redman album), 1989
- "Livin' on the Edge", a 1993 song by Aerosmith
- Living on the Edge, an album by Sandalinas
