= Maison Souquet =

Hotel in Paris, France

Coordinates: 48.88366°N 2.3291958°E

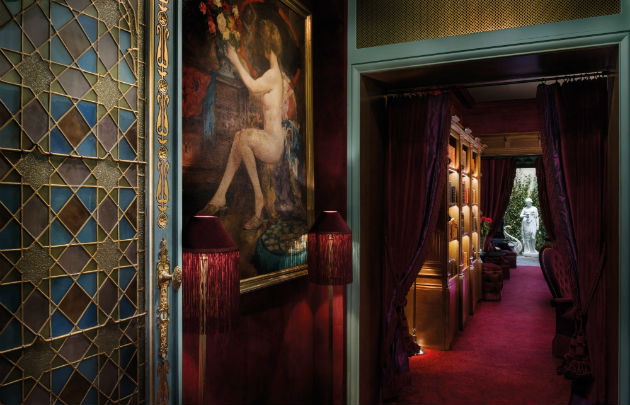
- Interior of Maison Souquet
- Interactive map of the Maison Souquet area

General information
- Type: 5-star Hotel
- Location: 10 rue de Bruxelles, Paris, France
- Opened: 2015
- Owner: Maisons Particuliere Collection

Technical details
- Floor area: 4

Design and construction
- Architect: Jacques Garcia

Other information
- Number of rooms: 20

Website
- http://www.maisonsouquet.com/en/

Maison Souquet is a 5-star hotel, part of Maisons Particulieres Collection (hotel group), located at 10, rue de Bruxelles in Paris, on the outskirts of Montmartre. The hotel is inspired by the Parisian brothels from the Belle Époque period. Maison Souquet is decorated by the French designer Jacques Garcia.

== History ==
Between 1871 and 1880, the building hosted a school for girls, named l'École Paulin.

In 1905, Mme. Souquet created a discrete maison close (brothel), perfectly echoing the Parisian customs and aesthetics of the Belle Époque period.

From 1907 onwards, Maison Souquet became a regular hotel.

In 2013, Maisons Particulieres Collection acquired the building and started a two-year renovation period in order to create a 5-star hotel. At its opening in 2015, Maison Souquet joined the "Small Luxury Hotel of the World" Collection.

== Interior design ==
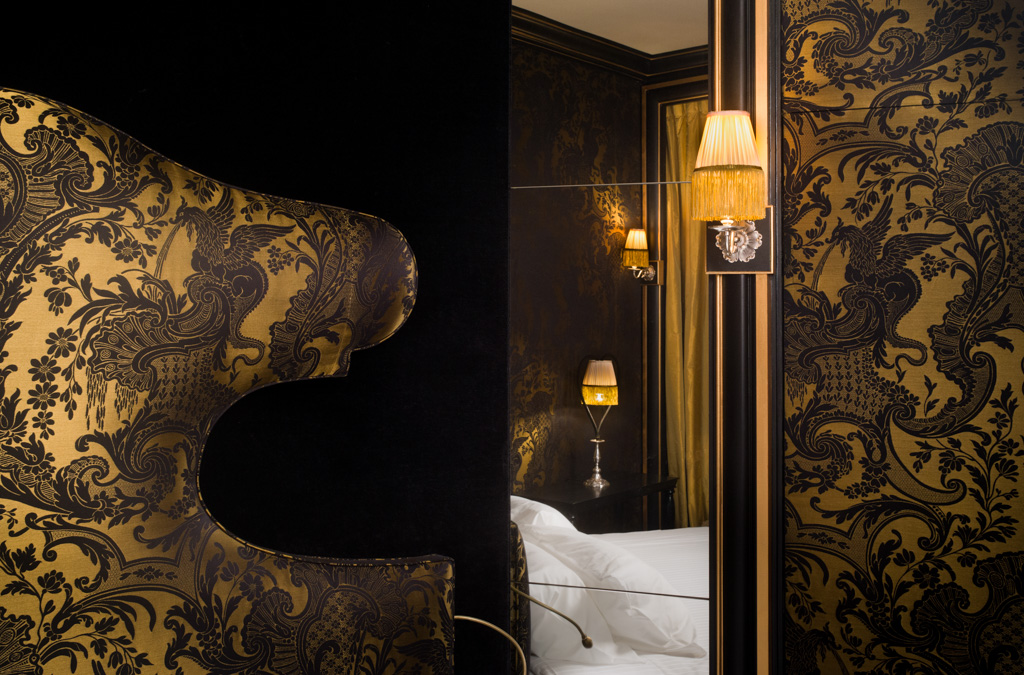

To create a special atmosphere at the hotel, Jacques Garcia drew his inspiration from the Parisian brothels of the Belle Époque period. All of the decorative elements were from the end of the 19th century and the beginning of the 20th century.

=== Lounges ===
The Maison Souquet consists of a succession of salons, reflecting the original configuration of the houses of pleasure. Today we can see the Le Salon des Mille et Une Nuits (Salon of the 1001 nights), the Salon des Petits Bonheurs and the Jardin d'Hiver (The winter garden).

==== Le Salon des Mille et Une Nuits ====
Formerly, the first lounge was known as a "chat room" or "social room". It was reserved for men. Politicians, bankers, captains of industry and artists gathered there in a private club format to talk about world affairs and business.

Purchased in 2013 from a renowned Belgian antique dealer, the 1001-night show is a unique piece. This salon was originally in a private mansion in the heart of Brussels. This was a special order made by a wealthy Belgian aristocrat to reproduce in his mansion a setting similar to the greatest Moorish palaces of the 19th century. This decoration was completed in 1895. It consists of precious enamel, polychrome wood with gold highlights, and adorned with Cordoba leather. This required meticulous work to be adapted to the specification of Maison Souquet.

==== Le Salon des Petits Bonheurs ====
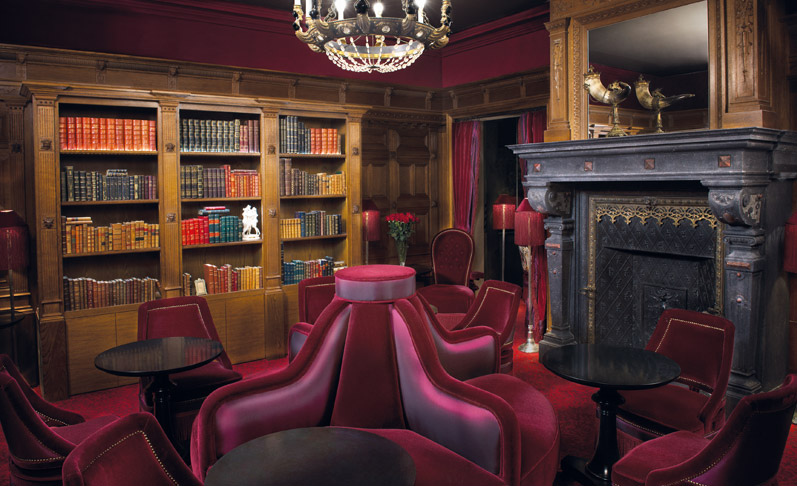

This second lounge was once used as a "presentation room". Courtesans and guests met before going to one of the rooms of the house.

Today renamed Salon des Petits Bonheurs, it consists of a hidden bar where refined dishes and precious spirits are found, a library, board games, a monumental fireplace and woodwork inherited from the late nineteenth century.

==== Le Jardin d'Hiver ====
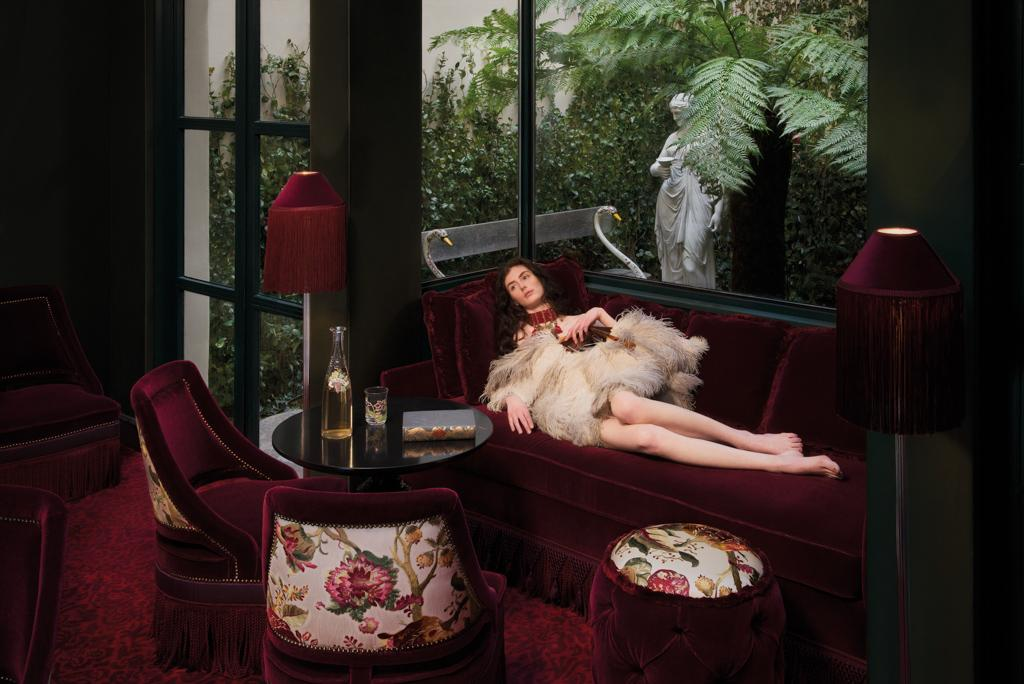

This last salon was formerly called the "salon after". It previously served as an "After Lounge" where men could extend their evening around a last drink.

==== Le Salon d'Eau ====
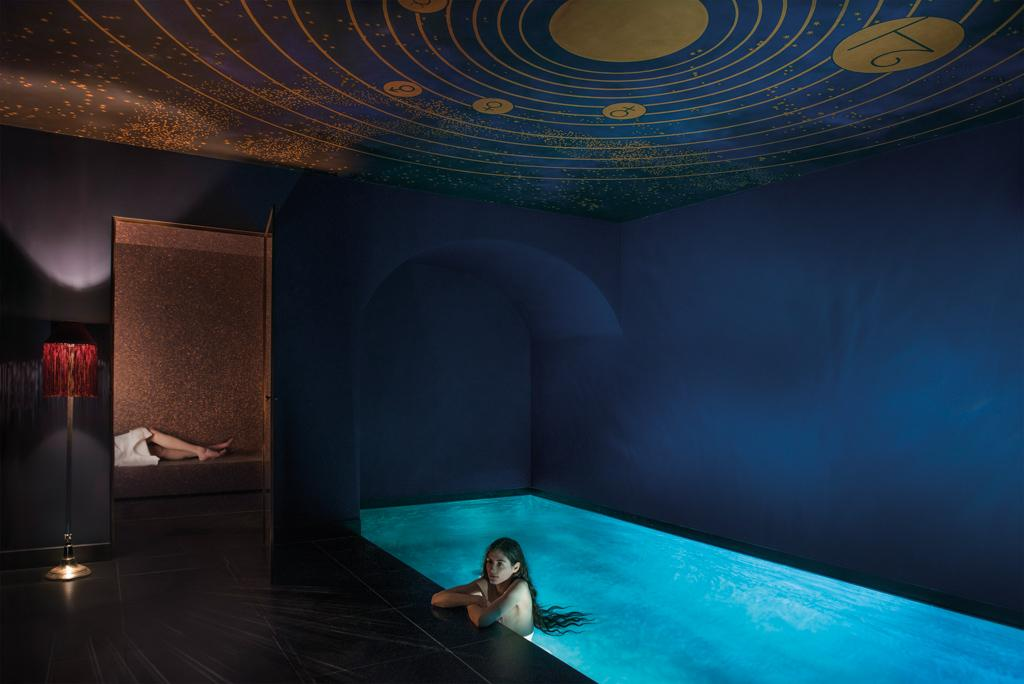

Reserved exclusively for guests who request the key, the secret spa is decorated with a celestial ceiling whose gold stars shimmer across a cobalt blue sky. The stars sparkle above a 9 metre long swimming pool which is adjacent to a steam bath and a body treatment room.

=== Rooms ===
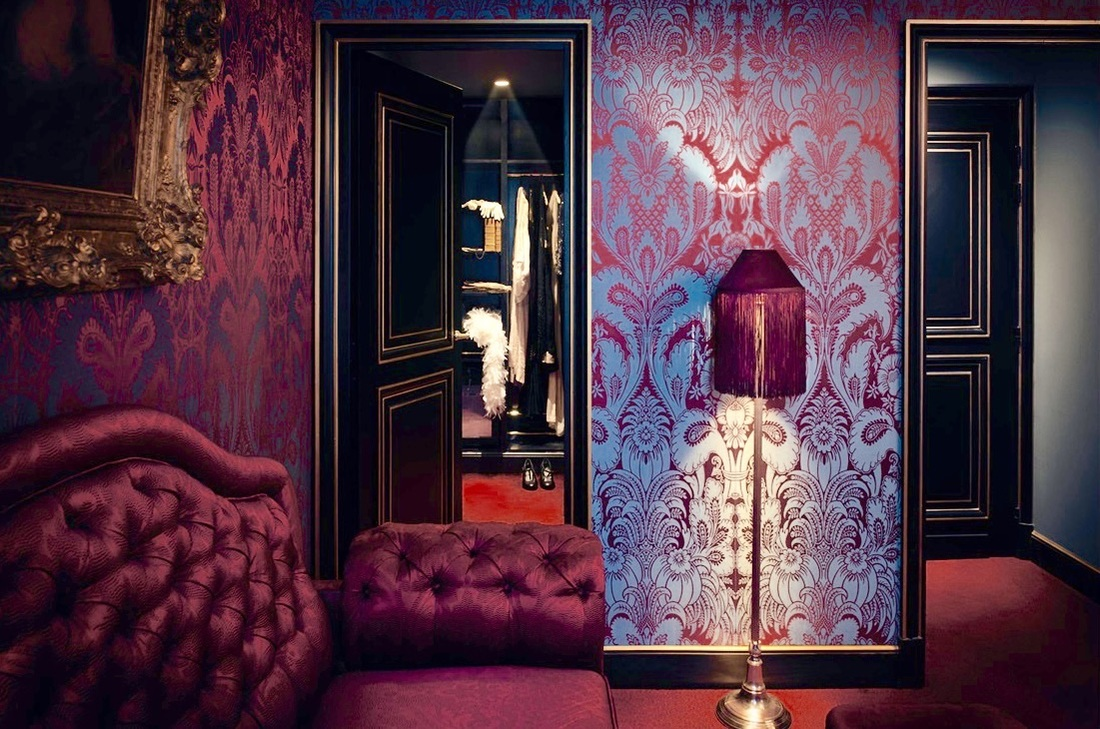

Maison Souquet is composed of 20 rooms including six suites and two apartments with unique decorations.

Decorations are inspired by several styles including those of Napoleon III, Indian, Chinese, Japanese, Empire and French 18th century.

Each room is named after a famous courtesan, among them are La Castiglione, La Paiva, Liane de Pougy and La Belle Otero. The rooms are embellished with different fabrics, silk and embroidery.

== Sponsorship ==
At its opening, Maison Souquet partnered Musée d'Orsay for its exhibition entitled "Splendeurs et misères. Images of prostitution, 1850-1910". The collaboration included the publication of a book entitled Splendeurs & misères by Editions Flammarion.

== Awards ==
- Best luxury hotels in France (Travellers’ Choice Award 2017).
- Top 25 best luxury hotels in the world (Travellers’ Choice Award 2017).
- Top 25 best romantic hotels in the world (Travellers’ Choice Award 2017).
- Top 5 best hotels in Paris (Condé Nast Travellers).

== See also ==
- Jacques Garcia
- Musée d'Orsay
- Parisian Brothels

== Notes ==
=== External links ===
- Official website of Maison Souquet
- Official website of Maisons Particuliere Collection
- Official website of Small Luxury Hotel of the World
