= Lota =

Lota may refer to:

== Places ==
- Lota (crater), a crater on Mars
- Lota, Chile, a city and commune in Chile
- Lota, Punjab, village in Pakistan
- Lota, Queensland, a suburb of Brisbane, Australia
  - Lota railway station, a station on the Cleveland line
  - Lota House, a heritage-listed house in Lota, Queensland

== People ==
- Lota (name)

== Animals ==
- Lota, former circus elephant who was moved to The Elephant Sanctuary (Hohenwald)
- Lota lota or Burbot, a codlike fish

== Other uses ==
- Chilean frigate Lota, a ship of the Chilean Navy
- Lota (vessel), water vessel used in parts of South Asia
- LOTA (Longshoreman of the Apocalypse), a character in the webcomic Schlock Mercenary
- LOTA (Licentiate of the Orthodontic Technicians Association)

== See also ==
- Lotar (disambiguation)
- Lotta (disambiguation)
