= Spitzerberg Airport =

Spitzerberg Airport Flugplatz Spitzerberg
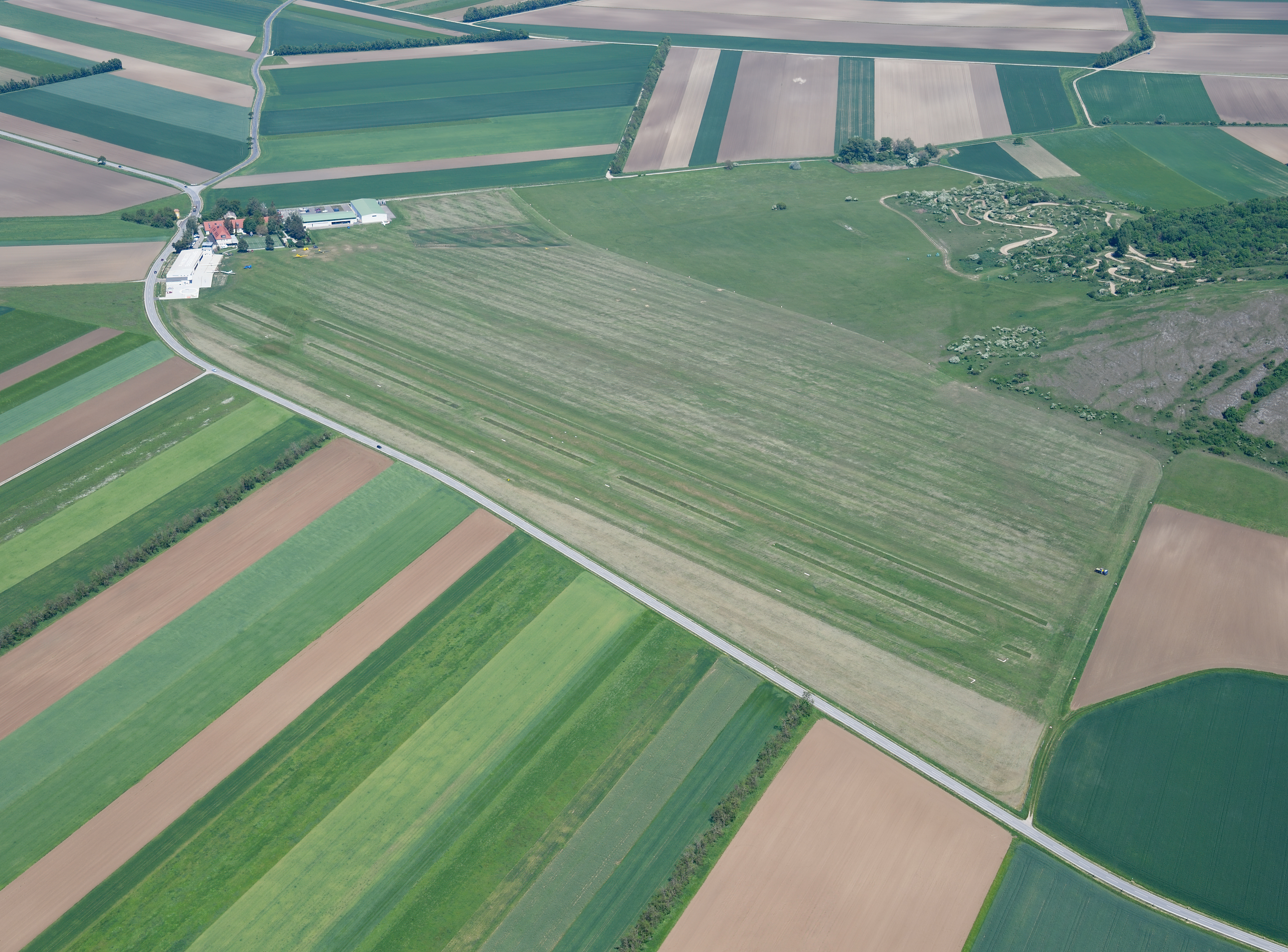
- IATA: none; ICAO: LOAS

Summary
- Airport type: Private
- Serves: Hundsheim
- Location: Austria
- Elevation AMSL: 620 ft / 189 m
- Coordinates: 48°5′55.7″N 016°55′59.9″E

Map
- Location of Spitzerberg Airport in Austria

Runways
Direction	Length		Surface
Direction	ft	m	Surface
15/33	2,290	698	Grass
- Source: Landings.com

Spitzerberg Airport (German: Flugplatz Spitzerberg, ICAO: LOAS) is a private use airport in Hundsheim, Lower Austria, Austria. The airport is located at the foot of the Spitzerberg. Part of the runway is included in the Spitzerberg nature reserve.

== See also ==
- List of airports in Austria
