= Hôtel Costes =

Hotel in Paris, France

Coordinates: 48°52′0.04″N 2°19′42.09″E

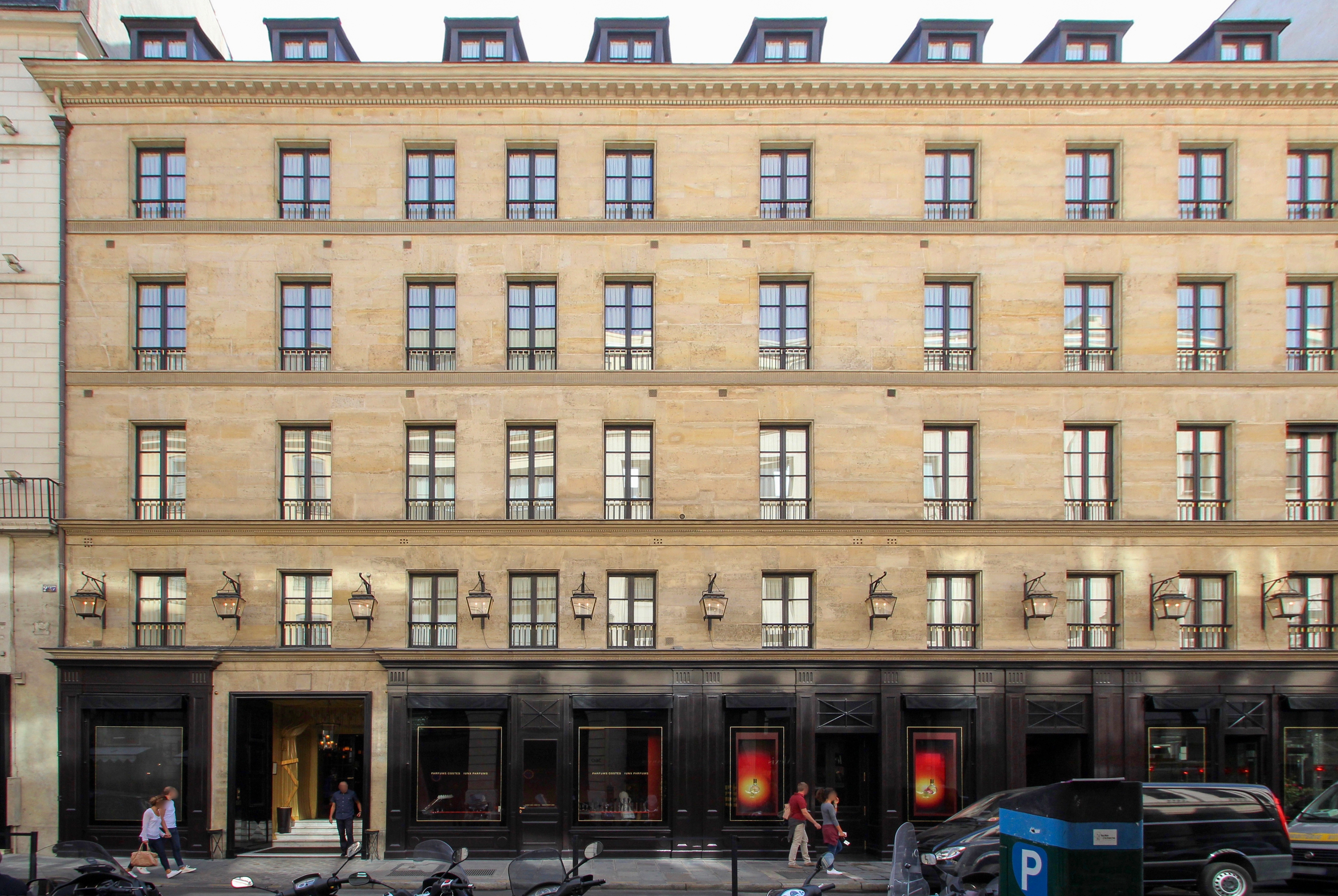
- 239 Rue Saint-Honoré in central Paris. The heritage-listed original façade of the Hôtel Costes
- Interactive map of the Hôtel Costes area

General information
- Location: 7 Rue de Castiglione, Paris, France
- Opened: 1995

Design and construction
- Architect: Jacques Garcia

Website
- hotelcostes.com

The Hôtel Costes (French pronunciation: [otɛl kɔst]) is a luxury hotel in central Paris, France. Located at 7 Rue de Castiglione in the 1st arrondissement, it is perhaps best known for its bar and courtyard café.

== History ==
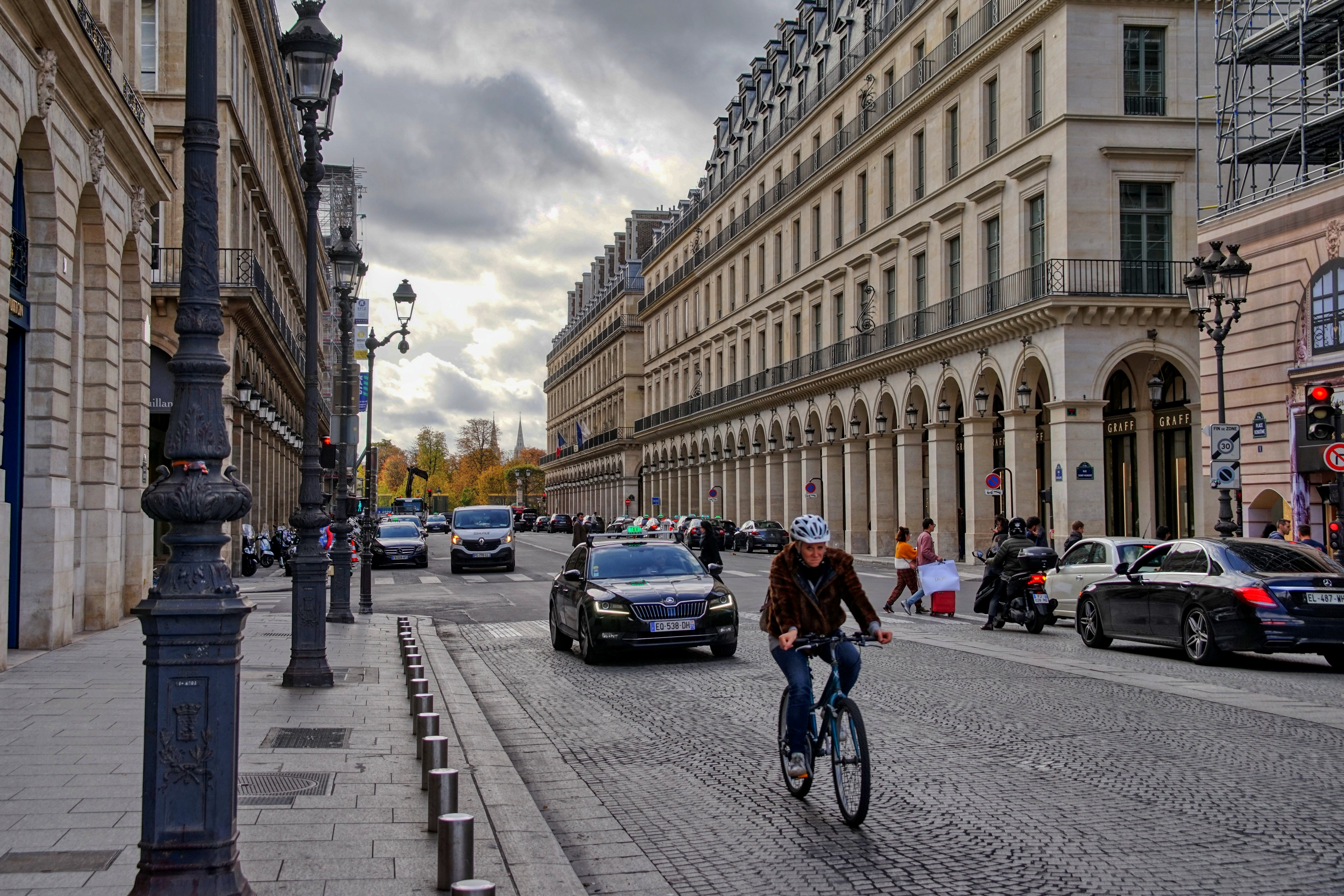
The new main wing of the Hôtel Costes, originally the Hotel Lotti, directly above the bicyclist

The hotel was commissioned by the Costes brothers, Jean-Louis and Gilbert, from the designer and interior architect Jacques Garcia in 1991. It opened in 1995 at 239 Rue Saint-Honoré. The hotel is now renowned as a den of opulence and was built in conjunction with Klay Robson as Developer and construction consultant (the design maxim was "all things in excess").

Hôtel Costes is not to be confused with the hotel Costes K, which is run by the same family, but is not located in Paris' first arrondissement.

In 2012, the Hotel started working on a new musical direction designed by former EMI/Virgin France Head of A&R Thierry Planelle and music supervisor Frederic Schindler , which took over the music curation after Stéphane Pompougnac's departure following the release of the last lounge music series compilation in September 2011.

In 2016, Hôtel Costes signed a partnership with Apple and launched a worldwide Curator channel on Apple Music . The updated musical direction is reflected on the new streaming-only Costes Selections, translating the "best of" of the hotel's monthly music programming, which is also available live on the hotel's webradio . The Costes Apple Music Channel features a monthly 15-song compilation featuring premieres and some exclusive unreleased songs curated in an eclectic and contemporary approach, ranging from electronica to 60s French chanson. At the end of every year, a Collection showcasing Costes favourite 50 tracks of the year is published.

In 2014, Jean-Louis Costes bought the adjacent Hotel Lotti, opened in 1910. He gutted it and turned it into a new wing of the hotel, which opened in 2020, giving it a new main entrance on Rue de Castiglione.
