= Lotar =

Lotar may refer to:

- A hand-to-hand combat system related to Kapap
- An alternative spelling for lutar (short for lute guitar)
- The Gimbri of north Africa
- Lotar, Iran, a village
- Lotar (name)
- LOTAR, a special forces unit in the Israel Defense Forces
- LOTAR Eilat, an Israel Defense Forces special forces unit for the city of Eilat
- Lotar Olias, a German film composer

== See also ==
- Logar (disambiguation)
- Lontar (disambiguation)
- Lopar (disambiguation)
- Lota (disambiguation)
- Lotan (disambiguation)
- Lothar (disambiguation)
