= Automobile Racing Club of America =

American auto racing sanctioning body

- Sport: Stock car racing
- Jurisdiction: United States
- Abbreviation: ARCA
- Founded: 1953
- Affiliation: NASCAR
- Owner: NASCAR
- Headquarters: Toledo, Ohio, U.S.
- President: Ron Drager

Official website
- www.arcaracing.com
- (United States)

The Automobile Racing Club of America (ARCA) is an auto racing sanctioning body in the United States, founded in 1953 by John Marcum. A subsidiary of NASCAR since 2018, the current president of ARCA is Ron Drager, who took over the position in 1996 following the death of Bob Loga. The ARCA Menards Series races stock cars similar to those seen in past years in the NASCAR Cup Series, and indeed most cars used in the Menards Series were previously used in NASCAR. ARCA contains a mix of both professional racers and hobby racers alike, in addition to younger competitors trying to make a name for themselves, sometimes driving as part of a driver development program for a NASCAR team. ARCA Menards Series races are broadcast on Fox Sports 1, Fox Sports 2 or MAVTV, and they have been previously broadcast on ESPN, ESPN2, USA Network, TNN, Prime Network, CBS Sports Network, NBCSN, TBS, TNT, SpeedVision/Speed and Fox Sports Net.

ARCA owns both the Toledo Speedway and Flat Rock Speedway. ARCA formerly sanctioned the ARCA Midget Series from 1988 until 2002 and a truck-racing series called the ARCA Lincoln Welders Truck Series from 1999 to 2016.

== History ==
John Marcum founded the Midwest Association for Race Cars (MARC) in 1953 as a regional stock car racing series after working as an official for NASCAR founder Bill France Sr. In 1964, the name was changed to the "Automobile Racing Club of America" when the series became national by racing on superspeedways. This ARCA is not to be confused with the organization founded in 1933 with the same name, which was the forerunner of the Sports Car Club of America (SCCA). ARCA started racing at Daytona International Speedway in 1964, during the Daytona Speedweeks, at the request of Bill France Sr., who had raced against Marcum in the 1940s.

The ARCA/NASCAR relationship continues today. The series frequently schedule events at the same track on the same weekend. The ARCA event is frequently the Saturday support race to the Sunday NASCAR Cup event. For several decades, ARCA used older NASCAR Cup race cars at their events, and with the advent of the Car of Tomorrow, teams were able to sell off their older cars to ARCA teams; current NASCAR Cup driver Joey Logano drove in ARCA in 2008, driving veteran NASCAR Cup cars after the Cup move to the COT.

On April 27, 2018, NASCAR acquired ARCA.

In 2019, it was announced that the NASCAR K&N Series East and West would be moved under the ARCA banner as the ARCA Menards Series East and ARCA Menards Series West for 2020.

Former NASCAR drivers, such as Benny Parsons, Kyle Petty (who won the 1979 Daytona ARCA 200, the first race he ever competed in), Ken Schrader and others, have competed in and advanced through the ARCA series on the way to successful NASCAR careers. ARCA has been used throughout its history as a stepping stone for hopeful NASCAR drivers.

== Points scoring system ==
ARCA uses a relatively simple point system to determine champions.

Year	1st	2nd	3rd	4th	5th	6th	7th	8th	9th	10th	11th	12th	13th	14th	15th	16th	17th	18th	19th	20th	21st	22nd	23rd	24th	25th	26th	27th	28th	29th	30th	31st	32nd	33rd	34th	35th	36th	37th	38th	39th	40th+
2009–2018	200	195	190	185	180	175	170	165	160	155	150	145	140	135	130	125	120	115	110	105	100	95	90	85	80	75	70	65	60	55	50	45	40	35	30	25	20	15	10	5

Note:

- Every finishing position between 1st and 40th is separated by five points, with the winning driver receiving 200 points and the 40th place driver receiving five points. Any driver who finishes behind 40th will receive five points.
- Points are also awarded for qualifying, with: 15 points awarded to the pole position, 10 points for the second fastest qualifier, and five for the third fastest qualifier.
- Any driver who leads an official lap will receive five bonus points.
- The driver who leads the most official laps will receive an additional five points.
- All drivers who pre-enter and compete in a race will receive an additional 25 points.
- Any driver who enters and competes in each pre-designated five race leg of the overall schedule will receive an additional 100 points.

== Series ==
- ARCA Menards Series
- ARCA Menards Series East
- ARCA Menards Series West
- ARCA Late Model Gold Cup Series

=== Former series ===
- ARCA Lincoln Welders Truck Series
- ASA/CRA Super Series
- ASA Midwest Tour
- ARCA OK Tire Sportsman Series

== Gallery ==
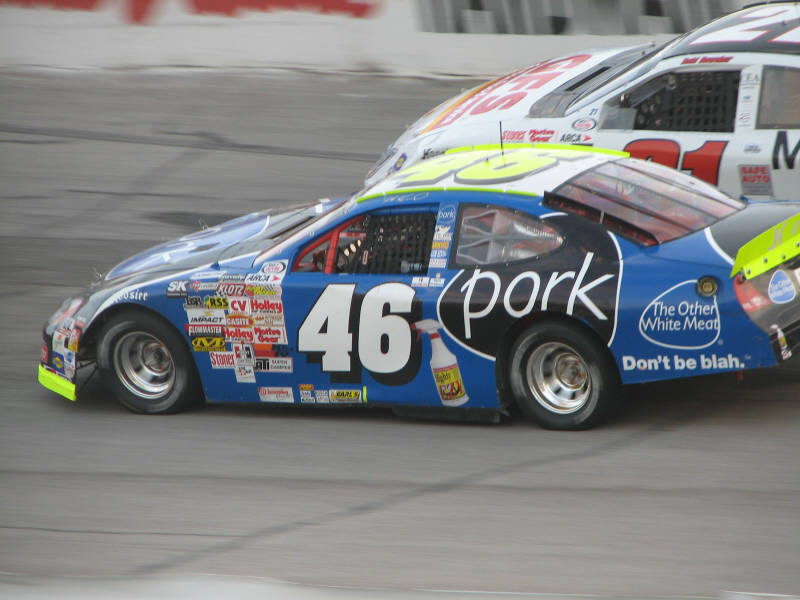
10-time ARCA Racing Series Champion Frank Kimmel racing in 2006.

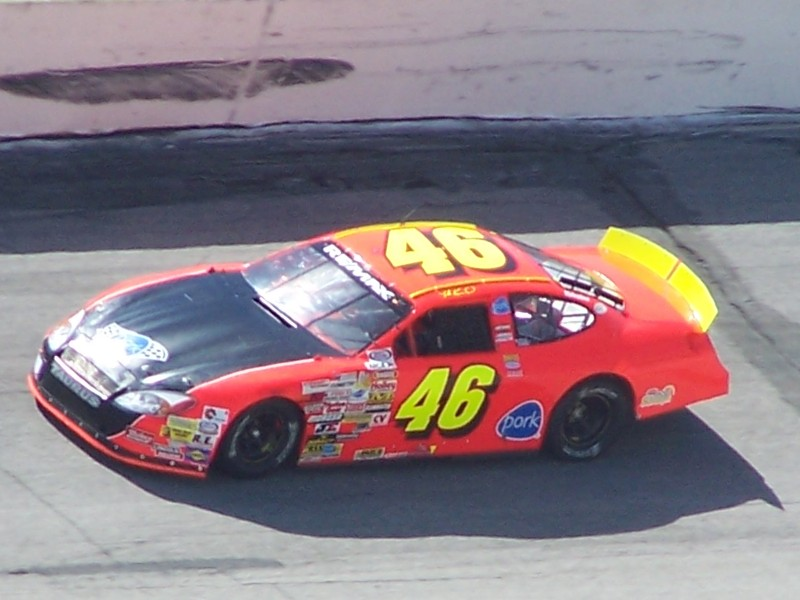
Kimmel drives the number 46 through the corners of Salem Speedway in Indiana, USA.

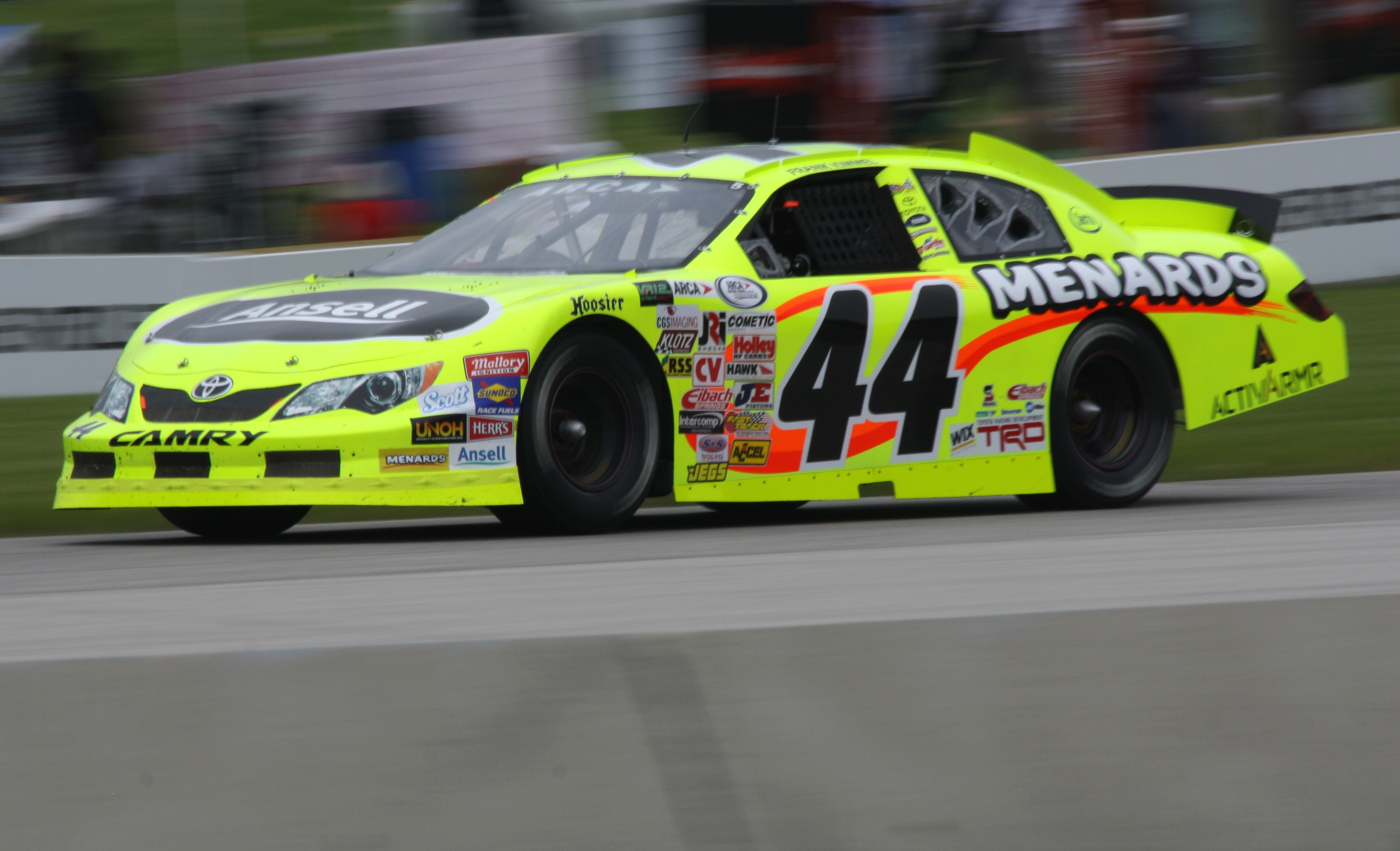
Kimmel in his Menards Toyota in 2013.

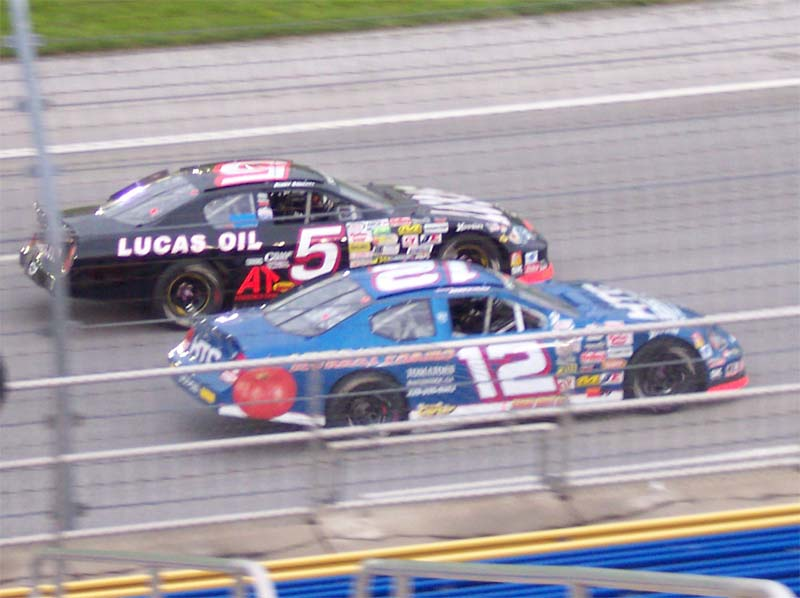
Series veteran Bobby Gerhart (5) racing at Kentucky Speedway.

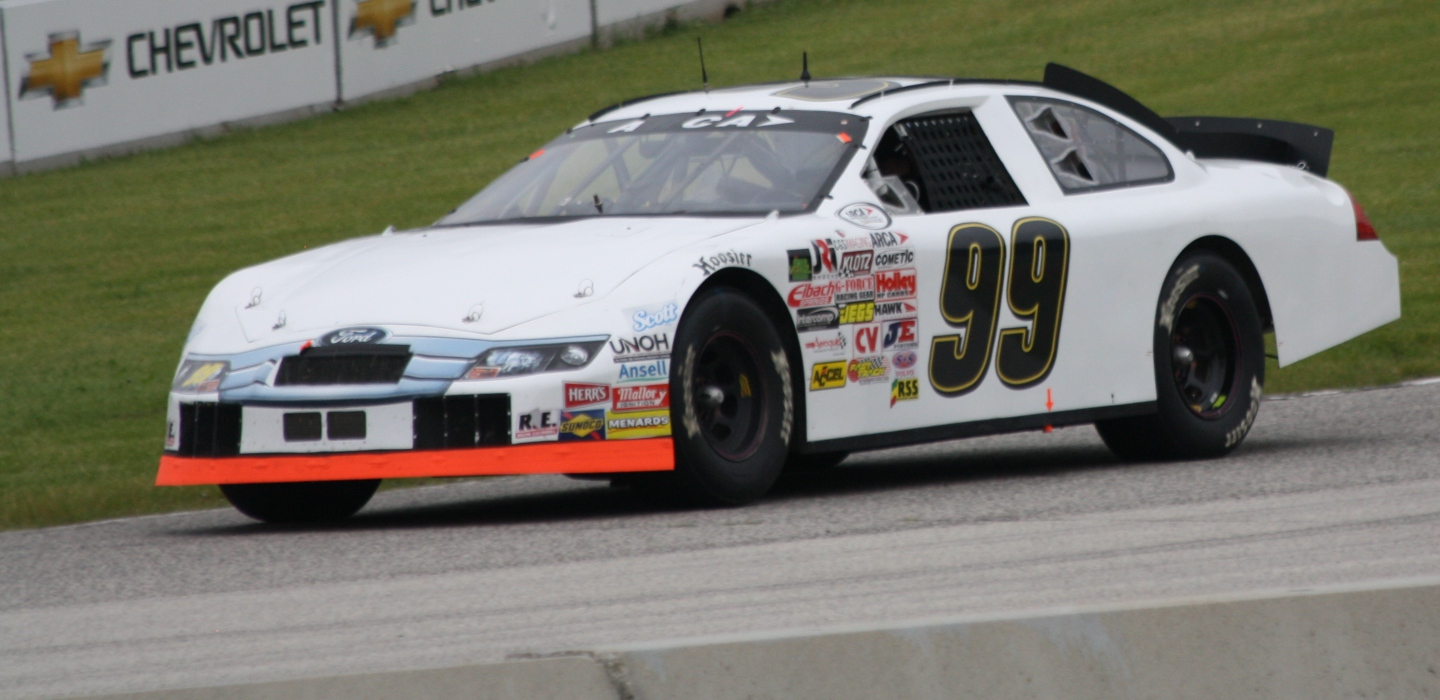
Roush Fenway Racing driver Chris Buescher was the first driver ever to compete every lap in a season in his 2012 championship year.

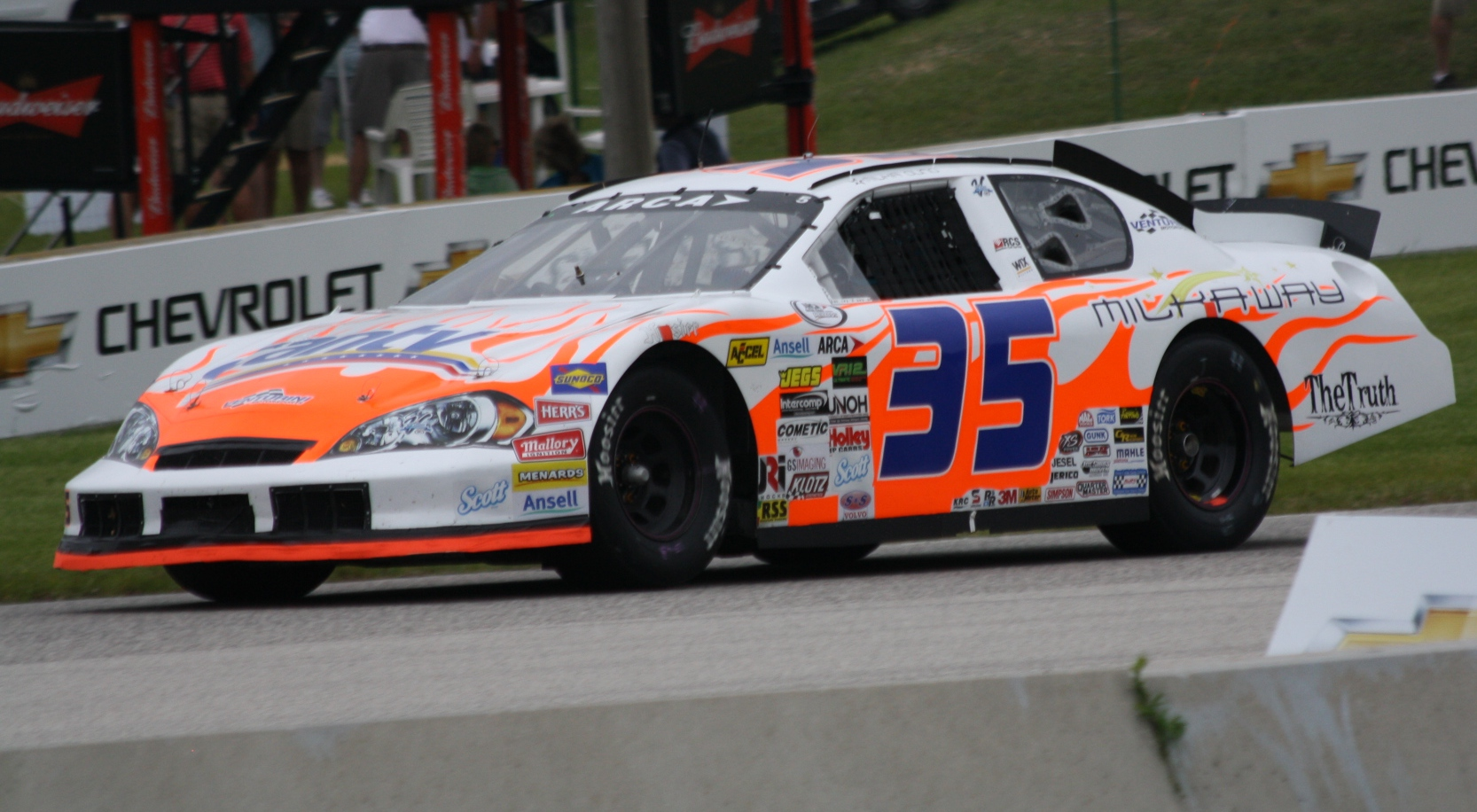
Venturini Motorsports is one of the larger ARCA operations, fielding cars for aspiring stock car racers (such as Milka Duno here in 2013).

== See also ==
- United States Auto Club
- Sports Car Club of America
- Automobile Association of America
- Automobile Club of America
