= Maison Gainsbourg =

Former home of and museum dedicated to Serge Gainsbourg in Paris

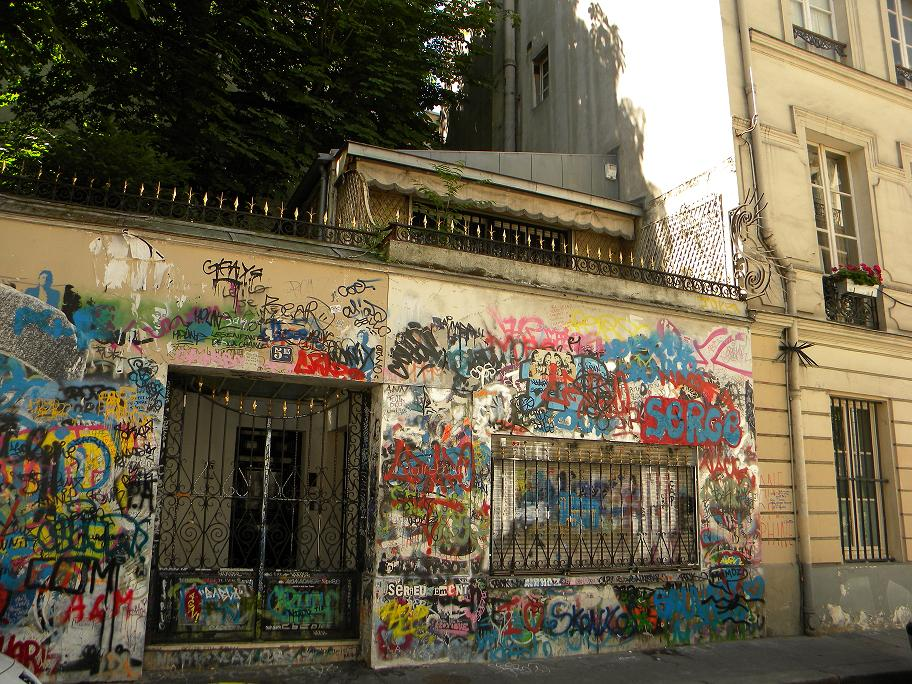
- The exterior of Maison Gainsbourg on the Rue de Verneuil

- Location within Paris
- Established: 20 September 2023; 2 years ago
- Location: 5bis (residence); 14bis (museum and bar); Rue de Verneuil; 7th arrondissement, Paris, France
- Coordinates: 48.85712°N 2.331608°E
- Type: Historic house museum
- Director: Anatole Maggiar
- Curator: Sébastien Merlet
- Website: maisongainsbourg.fr

Maison Gainsbourg (French: [mɛzɔ̃ ɡɛ̃zbuʁ]; Gainsbourg House) is a house museum in Paris dedicated to French musician Serge Gainsbourg (1928–1991). It comprises Gainsbourg's residence at 5bis Rue de Verneuil, preserved as it appeared on 2 March 1991, the day Gainsbourg died there; and a museum, library, bookstore, and piano bar called Gainsbarre at 14bis Rue de Verneuil. It opened in September 2023.

== History ==
Gainsbourg bought the house at 5 bis in 1969, the year he and Jane Birkin recorded "Je t'aime... moi non plus." Gainsbourg and Birkin lived there until separating in 1980. Gainsbourg had called the residence his "maison-musée" ("house-museum").

After Gainsbourg died in 1991, the home stayed closed for over 30 years. Its exterior became covered with graffiti. Gainsbourg's daughter Charlotte owns and preserved the residence.

== The house ==
The house at 5 bis appears as it did on the day of Gainsbourg's death. The 130-square-metre (1,400 sq ft) house is dark, with black felt covering the walls.

The house holds roughly 25,000 items, including antique furniture, gold records, cigarette packs, framed spiders, surgical tools, police badges, and the Steinway piano where Gainsbourg composed. Artwork depicts his muses, including Brigitte Bardot, Catherine Deneuve, Juliette Gréco, Françoise Hardy, Vanessa Paradis, and Birkin.

Visitors enter in pairs at timed intervals. They wear headphones playing an audio guide narrated by Charlotte Gainsbourg in French and English, backed by archival sounds.

== Museum and bar ==
The building at 14 bis rue de Verneuil houses a museum and piano bar, the Gainsbarre, which presents a visual timeline of Gainsbourg's life and career. The collection includes letters, photographs, lyrics written by Gainsbourg, an original "La Marseillaise" draft by Claude Joseph Rouget de Lisle, and the sculpture L'Homme à tête de chou by Claude Lalanne. A basement space hosts temporary exhibitions. Jacques Garcia designed the museum and bar in the house's aesthetic.
