= John Marcum =

American racing driver

- Born: 1913
- Died: 1981 (aged 67–68); Temperance, Michigan, U.S.
- Occupation: Executive
- Organization: Automobile Racing Club of America
- Known for: Founding ARCA
- Title: President
- Term: 1953–1981
- Successor: Bob Loga, Rollo Juckette

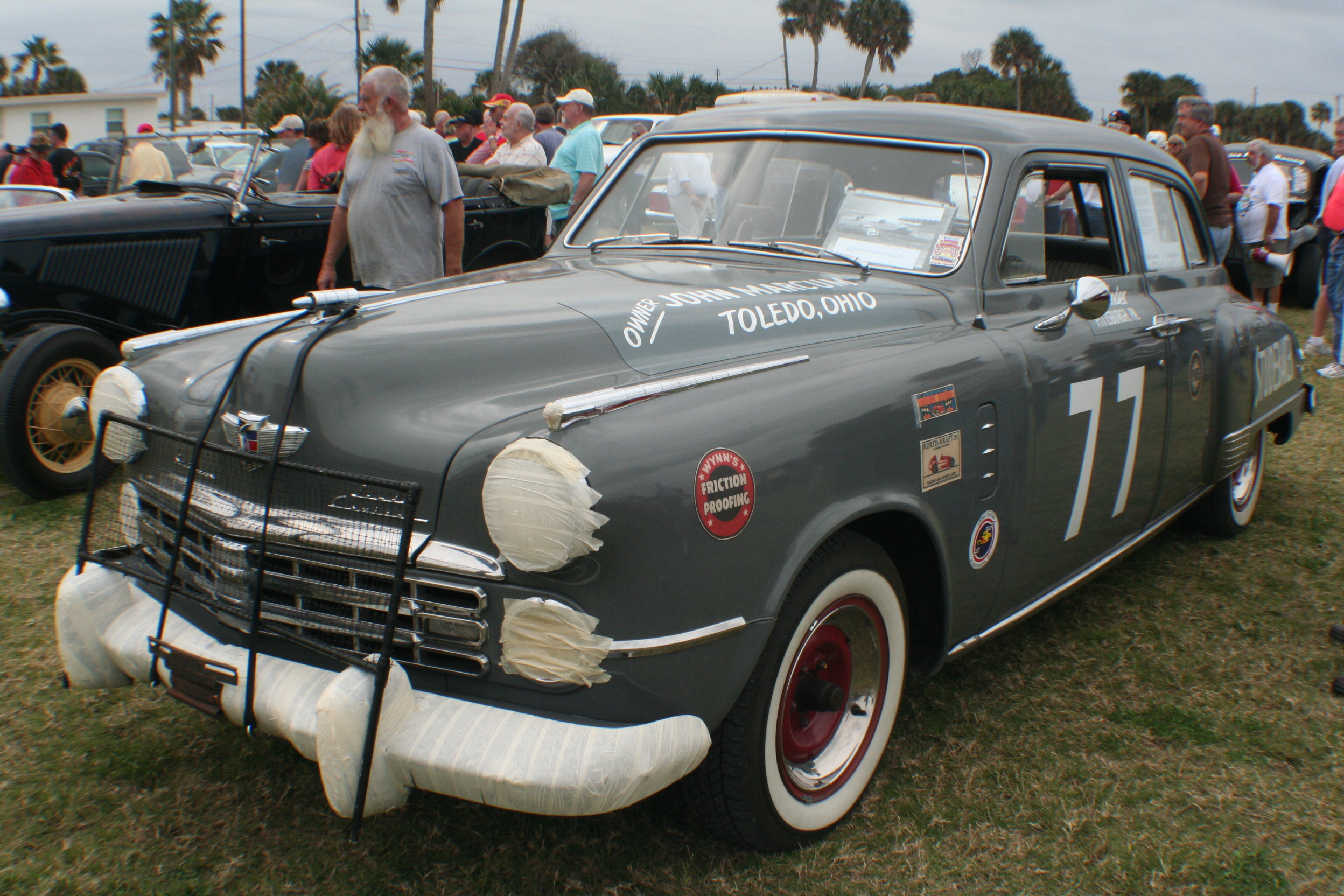
A Marcum-owned Studebaker used in one NASCAR race

John Marcum (1913–1981) was the co-founder of ARCA and a NASCAR official from Toledo, Ohio, United States. He raced in the 1930s and 1940s. He owned cars entered in two NASCAR Grand National Series races with one Top 10 finish. He was inducted in the International Motorsports Hall of Fame in 1994. Marcum would be inducted into the Dayton Speedway Hall of Fame in October, 2010.

Marcum first raced as a 14-year-old in his family car after lying about his age. Marcum raced against NASCAR founder Bill France Sr. in the 1940s in open wheel roadsters. After France formed NASCAR in the late 1940s, he hired Marcum as an official, a position that he held from 1949 until 1952.

In 1953, Marcum created a Midwestern United States racing series called "Midwest Association for Race Cars" (MARC) with his wife Mildred in his hometown Toledo, Ohio. It was a regional stock car racing series, a Northern counterpart to the Southern stock car series of the day, Bill France's NASCAR. The first MARC race was at Dayton Speedway, in Dayton, Ohio, on May 10, 1953. The series race slightly modified street cars.

John Marcum, Blair Rattliff, and Tom Cushman would be part owners of Dayton Speedway in 1958.

The series was renamed "Automobile Racing Club of America" (ARCA) in 1964 when it began to race on superspeedways. France had contacted Marcum wondering if ARCA would want a race at the Daytona Speedweeks. Marcum jumped at the chance for national exposure. The ARCA/NASCAR relationship continues today. The series frequently schedules events at the same track on the same weekend. The ARCA event is frequently the Saturday support race to the Sunday NASCAR Cup event. For several decades, ARCA used older NASCAR Cup racecars at their events. Today ARCA's President is the late John Marcum's grandson Ron Drager. John's wife, Mildred Marcum, was an integral part of the organization and worked both in the ARCA office regularly until her death at 98 in 2012.*
