= Lotario (given name) =

Lotario is a Latin, Italian, and Spanish masculine given name, while Lotário is a Portuguese masculine given name. Both names are modern forms of the Germanic Chlothar (which is a blended form of Hlūdaz and Harjaz). People with this name include:

- Lotario dei Conti di Segni, birthname of Pope Innocent III (1160 or 1161 – 1216), Italian Roman Catholic Pope
- Lotario Tomba (1749–1823), Italian architect

Fictional characters include:

- Lotario, alto in Handel's opera Lotario
- Lotario, in Miguel de Cervantes’s Don Quixote

== See also ==
- Lotario (Handel)
- Lothario
- Bonifacio di Castel Lotario (died 1504), Italian Roman Catholic prelate
