= Jacques Garcia =

French architect and designer (born 1947)

- Born: Jacques Alain Garcia; 25 September 1947 (age 78); Malakoff, France
- Occupation: Architect
- Practice: Interior design
- Buildings: Château du Champ de Bataille
- Projects: La Mamounia; La Réserve Paris; La Réserve Ramatuelle; Hotel Costes; L'oscar London; The Nomad NY; L'Hôtel; Hôtel Odéon; Maison Souquet; Maison Proust; Spice Market New York; Hotel Vagabond Singapore; Château Louise de La Vallière; L'Escape Hotel Seoul; Maison Gainsbourg

Jacques Alain Garcia (French pronunciation: [ʒak ɡaʁsja]; born 25 September 1947) is a French architect, interior designer and garden designer, best known for his contemporary interiors of Paris hotels and restaurants. He is the current owner of the Château du Champ de Bataille in Normandy.

== Early life and education ==
Born in 1947 to a Spanish father, Jacques Garcia showed a talent for drawing and objects of art at a young age. At the age of eight, he constructed and furnished his first structure at the home of his grandparents. Thereafter he attended a school of interior design and completed his education in the applied arts.

== Career ==
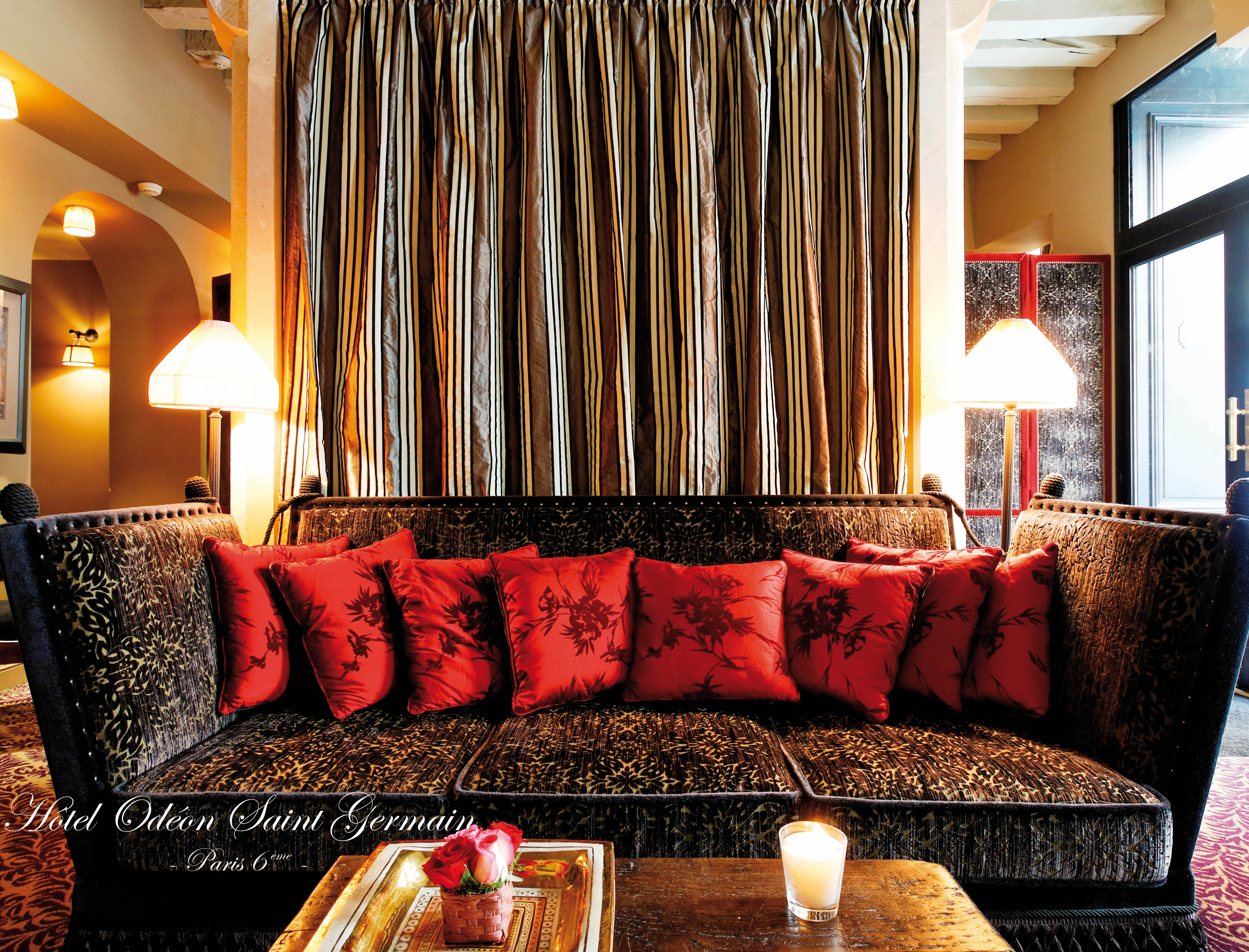
The Hôtel Odéon Saint Germain in Paris, decorated by Jacques Garcia (2006)

When he finished his education, he began working for a firm of contemporary architects, and created the concepts for the interiors of the Tour Montparnasse in Paris, Le Méridien hotels, and the Royal Monceau à Paris. He was also the interior architect for the Hôtel Costes and Costes restaurants, the Hotel Majestic, and the restaurant Fouquet's. In 2006, he redecorated the Hôtel Odéon Saint Germain in Paris.

In 2023, Garcia designed the interiors for Maison Gainsbourg's museum, bookshop, and piano bar to reflect the aesthetic of musician Serge Gainsbourg's Paris home.

== Château du Champ de Bataille ==
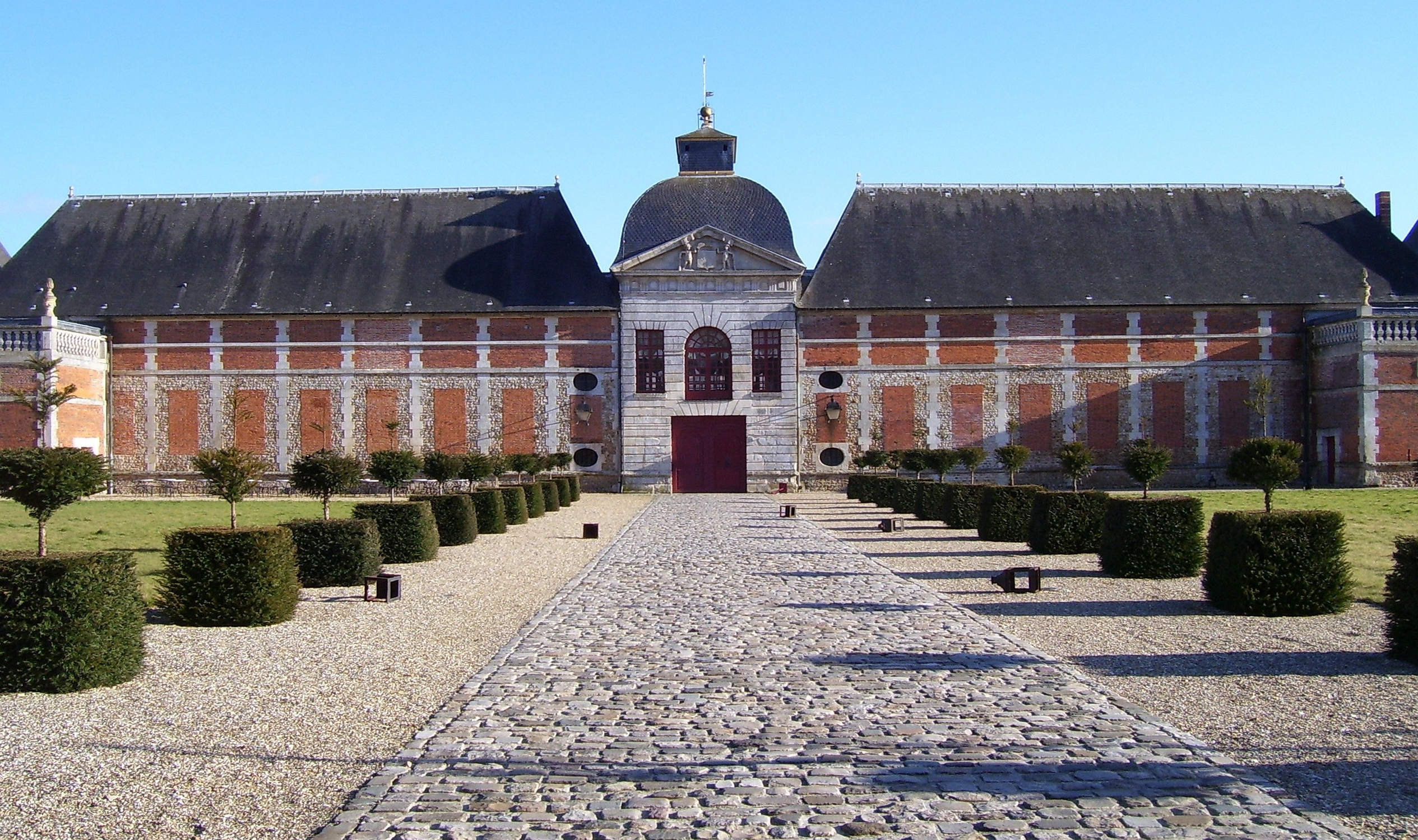
Entrance of the château

Garcia purchased the Château du Champ de Bataille in Normandy in 1992. The Baroque château was built in the 17th century for the Maréchal de Créqui and lies between the communes of Neubourg and Sainte-Opportune-du-Bosc. Garcia restored the château and recreated its French formal garden. He also assembled a collection of furniture and royal art objects dispersed after the French Revolution.

== Honors and awards ==
For his achievements, Garcia was named a commander of the Ordre des Arts et des Lettres (2002) and of the Légion d'honneur (2017).

== Works ==
- Garcia, Jacques; Servat, Henry-Jean. Le Style à La Traviata. Albin Michel. ISBN 978-2-226-15203-9.
- Garcia, Jacques; Ferrand, Franck. L'Éloge du décor. Flammarion. ISBN 978-2-08-011465-5.
- Garcia, Jacques; Ferrand, Frank. Moderne. Gallimard. ISBN 978-2-07-011749-9.

=== Bibliography ===
- Jacques Garcia by Franck Ferrand, published by Flammarion.
- Jacques Garcia : ou L'Éloge du décor by Franck Ferrand.

=== Filmography ===
- Jacques Garcia, gentleman décorateur (52mn), by Francis Blaise.
