= Stéphane Pompougnac =

French house DJ and record producer (born 1968)

- Born: 1968 (age 56–57); Paris, France
- Origin: Bordeaux, France
- Genres: French house, downtempo, electro house, lounge music, hip house
- Occupation(s): DJ, singer
- Labels: Pschent Music, Wagram Music
- Website: myspace.com/djstephanepompougnac

Stéphane Pompougnac (born 1968) is a French house DJ and record producer best known for his long-running asso for curating and mixing the Hôtel Costes compilation series.

== Biography ==
Pompougnac was born in Paris in 1968 to a psychotherapist and a dental surgeon. He spent his early life in Bordeaux.

His first job was as a waiter at the courtyard café of Hôtel Costes in Paris' Les Halles district. He started DJing at 18 years of age, at Bordeaux discothèques such as Ubu, The Colony, and The Dream.

After finishing his studies and national service, Pompougnac spent six months in London before returning to Paris in 1992. In Paris he mixed at such discothèques as Queen, Folies Pigalle, The Locomotive, Diable des Lombards, and Privilège. One year later, he became the resident DJ at Les Bains et Douche, where he met Claude Challe. Reportedly, in 1997 Albert de Paname introduced Pompougnac to Jean-Louis Costes, co-owner of Hôtel Costes, where Pompougnac had worked as a waiter some ten years prior. This time, Costes hired Pompougnac to be the hotel's resident DJ. In 1999, Pompougnac published his first studio mix, Costes: France et Choiseul.

Pompougnac's second studio mix, Costes: La Suite outsold his previous release. After the mix's third track, "Sympathique" by Pink Martini, was used for an auto advertisement in France, Costes: La Suite sold more than 100,000 copies. Although Pompougnac published first two albums in France via Barclay Universal, his mounting success led to a contract with MSI, who published his third studio mix, Etage 3 (October 2000). His first three mixes collectively sold nearly half a million copies. Additionally, a number of tracks from his mixes, including one of his own compositions, "Morenito", can be found on the soundtrack of the auto racing video game Gran Turismo Sport.

Pompougnac has published more than 20 studio mixes, and also DJs for the fashion award show Les Venues de la Mode. He has also performed for fashion shows by Gucci and Yves Saint-Laurent.

== Discography ==
=== Studio albums ===
- Living on the Edge (2003)
- Hello Mademoiselle (2007)
- Bloody French (2014)

=== DJ mixes ===
==== Hôtel Costes series ====
- Hôtel Costes, Vol. 1: Café Costes (1999)
- Hôtel Costes, Vol. 2: La suite (1999)
- Hôtel Costes, Vol. 3: Étage 3 (2000)
- Hôtel Costes, Vol. 4: Quatre (2001)
- Hôtel Costes, Vol. 5: Cinq (2002)
- Hôtel Costes, Vol. 6 (2003)
- Hôtel Costes, Vol. 7: Sept (2004)
- Hôtel Costes, Best of Costes (2005)
- Hôtel Costes, Vol. 8 (2005)
- Hôtel Costes, Vol. 9 (2006)
- Hôtel Costes, Vol. 10 (2007)
- Hôtel Costes, Vol. 11 (2008)
- Hôtel Costes, Vol. 12 (2009)
- Hôtel Costes, A Decade: 1999–2009 (2009)
- Hôtel Costes, Vol. 14 (2010)
- Hôtel Costes, Vol. 15 (2011)

==== Other mix albums ====
- Saks Fifth Avenue (2002), mixed for Saks Fifth Avenue
- The Concorde Lounge: Supersonic Jet Set Love (2003), mixed for Japanese magazine Casa Brutus
- Sparkling Moments: Tokyo/Paris (2005), mixed for Perrier
- STARFLYER (2007), mixed for StarFlyer
- Night & Day (2011)
