= Lota (name) =

Lota is a Portuguese feminine given name that is a diminutive form of Carlota, a nickname and surname. Notable people referred to by this name include the following:

== Given name ==
- Lota Bowen (1872–1935), British painter
- Lota Cheek (1898–1978), American actress and model

== Nickname/stagename ==
- Lota Chukwu, stagename of Ugwu Lotachukwu Jacinta Obianuju Amelia, Nigerian actress
- Lota Delgado, nickname of Carlota Concepcion Delgado (1918-2009), Filipino actress
- Lota de Macedo Soares, nickname of Maria Carlota Costallat de Macedo Soares, (1910-1967), Brazilian landscape designer and architect

== Surname ==
- Dennis Lota (1973–2014), Zambian football player

== See also ==
- Lota (disambiguation)
- Lata (disambiguation)
- Lita (given name)
- Loa (disambiguation)
- Loka (disambiguation)
- Lola (given name)
- Loma (disambiguation)
- Lora (disambiguation)
- Lot (name)
- Lotan (disambiguation)
- Lotar (name)
- Lote (disambiguation)
- Alfred J. Lotka
- Lotta (name)
- Loza (surname)
