= Lopar =

Lopar may refer to:

- Lopar (Fojnica), a village in Bosnia and Herzegovina
- Lopar, Croatia, a village on the island of Rab
- Lopar, Koper, a village in Slovenia

== See also ==
- Lotar (disambiguation)
