= Frederic Schindler =

French-Argentinean music supervisor (born 1980)

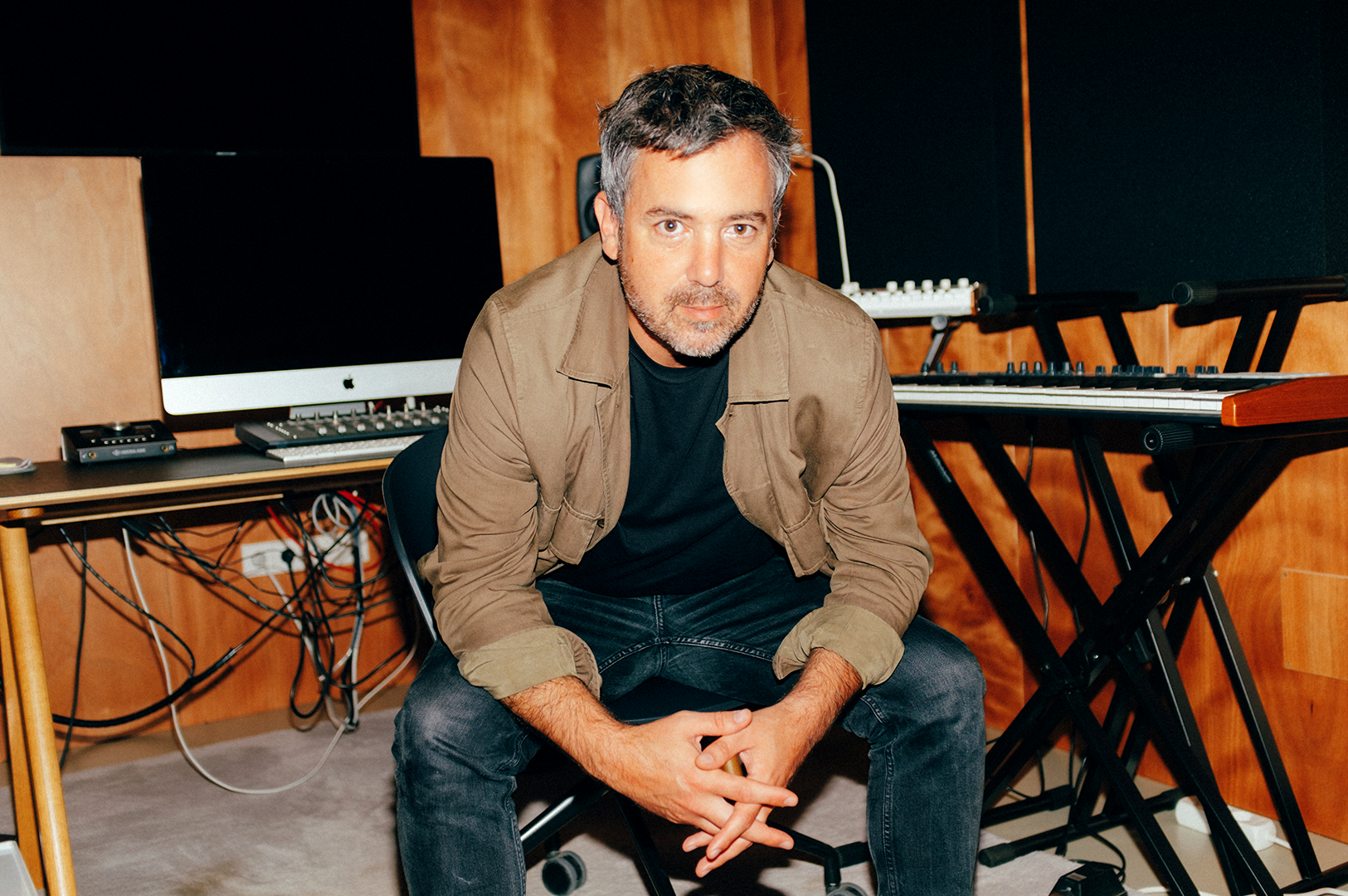
Frederic Schindler

Frederic Schindler (born 1980) is a French-Argentine music supervisor who has worked on more than 1000 commercials and several films, most notably Aaron Brookner and Jim Jarmusch documentary Uncle Howard, Emir Kusturica feature On The Milky Road., Berlinale Golden Bear winner Alcarrás and the Prada L'Homme et la Femme worldwide campaign featuring a bespoke cover by Perfume Genius of the iconic Pop Ballad Can't Help Falling in Love. He won a Music Week Sync Award in 2017 for Best Online Advert and was awarded Music Supervisor of the Year in 2025 by the Association of Independent Music (AIM)

== Biography ==
Frederic Schindler was born in Argentina where he attended the Lycée Franco-Argentin Jean Mermoz. He started his career working for the French Ministère des Affaires Etrangères as a Deputy Attaché for the Cultural Services, promoting French cinema & music in South America. He then became Managing Director of the Spanish language version of the French music magazine Les Inrockuptibles.

He's the Founder of the independent music supervision company, Too Young Ltd., the curated music supervision platform Catalog and the music curation service Movement. He worked on campaigns for Prada, Jean-Paul Gaultier, Chanel, Hôtel Costes, Renault, Nina Ricci, Nike, Paco Rabanne, Ford, Diesel, Mac Cosmetics, NGOs Casa Do Menor and 30 Millions d'Amis, among others. His work also includes management and A&R for artists such as Benjamin Biolay, Colder, Andrea Balency and Little Dragon.

He has been nominated for Best Sync at the Music + Sound Awards (2015, 2017 ), in several categories (Best Music Supervisor, Best Film Soundtrack, Best Online Advert) at the Music Week Sync Awards and at the Guild of Music Supervisors Awards in 2023 in the Best Music Supervision in Advertising (Synch) category. He teaches at Pompeu Fabra University and had speaking engagements at the Future Music Forum, London Sync Sessions, Spot +, Linecheck, AIM Connected and Primavera Sound.

In September 2024, Frederic Schindler announced the launch of Catalog, a curated music supervision platform. Catalog is designed to streamline the music licensing process for music supervisors and other visual media professionals by offering access to independent music from labels such as !K7, Beggars Group, Warp, Kompakt and Ninja Tune. The platform aims to address inefficiencies in the sync market and promote fairer artist compensation as an alternative to the prevalent use of stock music in visual media. Schindler presented Catalog at the AIM Connected conference at the Barbican Centre.

He is a Guild of Music Supervisors full member.
