= La Loca =

Latin American female mythotype

La Loca is a literary mythotype of the mad heroine found in Chicana literature related to La Llorona. Authors using the figure include Ana Castillo, Sandra Cisneros and Monica Palacios, as well as in the poem "La Loca de la Raza Cósmica" by the pseudonymous La Chrisx.

La Loca in Ana Castillo's So Far from God is an outsider from the community; she dies at age three, but is miraculously resurrected revered like a saint.

== La Loca in Ana Castillo's So Far From God ==
In So Far from God (1993), Castillo created a fictive family living in Tome, New Mexico. It is a story about a family with a single mother and her four daughters, each of whom is used to examine a different stereotype of Chicanas and the struggles they faced. This novel also focused on the relationship of Chicanos, Native Americans, and Anglos in the Southwest.

One of the main characters is La Loca, who died when she was three after suffering a seizure. At her funeral she was resurrected and claimed that she had gone to hell, purgatory, heaven, and was sent back to earth by God in order to pray for everyone. Due to this she was called a Saint, and was named ‘La Loca Santa’ because of the bewildering behavior following her resurrection.

Several Literary Scholars have written about the character of La Loca. Delgadillo, in Forms of Chicana Feminist Resistance: Hybrid Spirituality in Ana Castillo’s So Far from God, focused on self-discovery being achieved by spiritual hybridity. She argues that La Loca was a symbol of resistance because she stood up against the oppression Chicanas faced such as that from the church. In Contemporary American Women Fiction Writers: An A-to-Z Guide, by Champion and Austin there was a focus on La Loca representing women being natural healers. It focused on people healing with plants and the remedies being passed down through generations. In Castillo's text, La Loca was one of the many characters she used to explore and critique the role women have in Mexican American culture as well as sexism and the oppression they face.

== Bibliography ==
- Androne, Helane. Ritual Structures in Chicana Fiction. Missouri: Springer, 2016.
- Castillo, Ana. So Far from God. New York: Plume, 1993.
- Champion, Laurie and Austin, Rhanda. Contemporary American Women Fiction Writers: An A-to-Z Guide. Connecticut: Greenwood Publishing Group, 2002.
- Delgadillo, Theresa (1998). "Forms of Chicana Feminist Resistance: Hybrid Spirituality in Ana Castillo's So Far from God". MFS Modern Fiction Studies. 44: 888–916. doi:10.1353/mfs.1998.0108.
