= Lothair =

Lothair (Latin: Lotharius; German: Lothar; French: Lothaire) is a Germanic given name, derived from the older form Clotaire (Chlotharius).

== People ==
- Lothair I (795–855), King of Italy and Holy Roman Emperor
- Lothair I, Margrave of the Nordmark (940–1003)
- Lothair II of Lotharingia (825–869), a king, son of Emperor Lothair I
- Lothair II of Italy (died 950), a king
- Lothair III, Holy Roman Emperor (1075–1137), also called Lothair II
- Lothair of France (941–986), sometimes called Lothair II
- Lothair the Lame (died 865), Abbot of Saint-Germain-des-Prés
- Lothair Udo I, Count of Stade (950–994)
- Lothair Udo I, Margrave of the Nordmark (994–1057)
- Lothair Udo II, Margrave of the Nordmark (1025–1082)
- Lothair Udo III, Margrave of the Nordmark (1070–1106)

== Other uses ==
- Lothair, Georgia, in the United States
- Lothair, Montana, in the United States
- Lothair, Kentucky, in the United States
- Lothair, South Africa, a town in Mpumalanga
- Lothair (novel), by Benjamin Disraeli
- Lothair (clipper), a ship built in Britain in 1870
- M. Lothaire, pseudonym of a group of mathematicians
- Cross of Lothair
- Lothair Crystal

== See also ==
- Lothar (disambiguation)
- Lothaire
- Luther (disambiguation)
- Chlothar (disambiguation)
