= Loga Park =

Park in Russia

Coordinates: 48°21′09″N 40°17′50″E

- Парк Лога
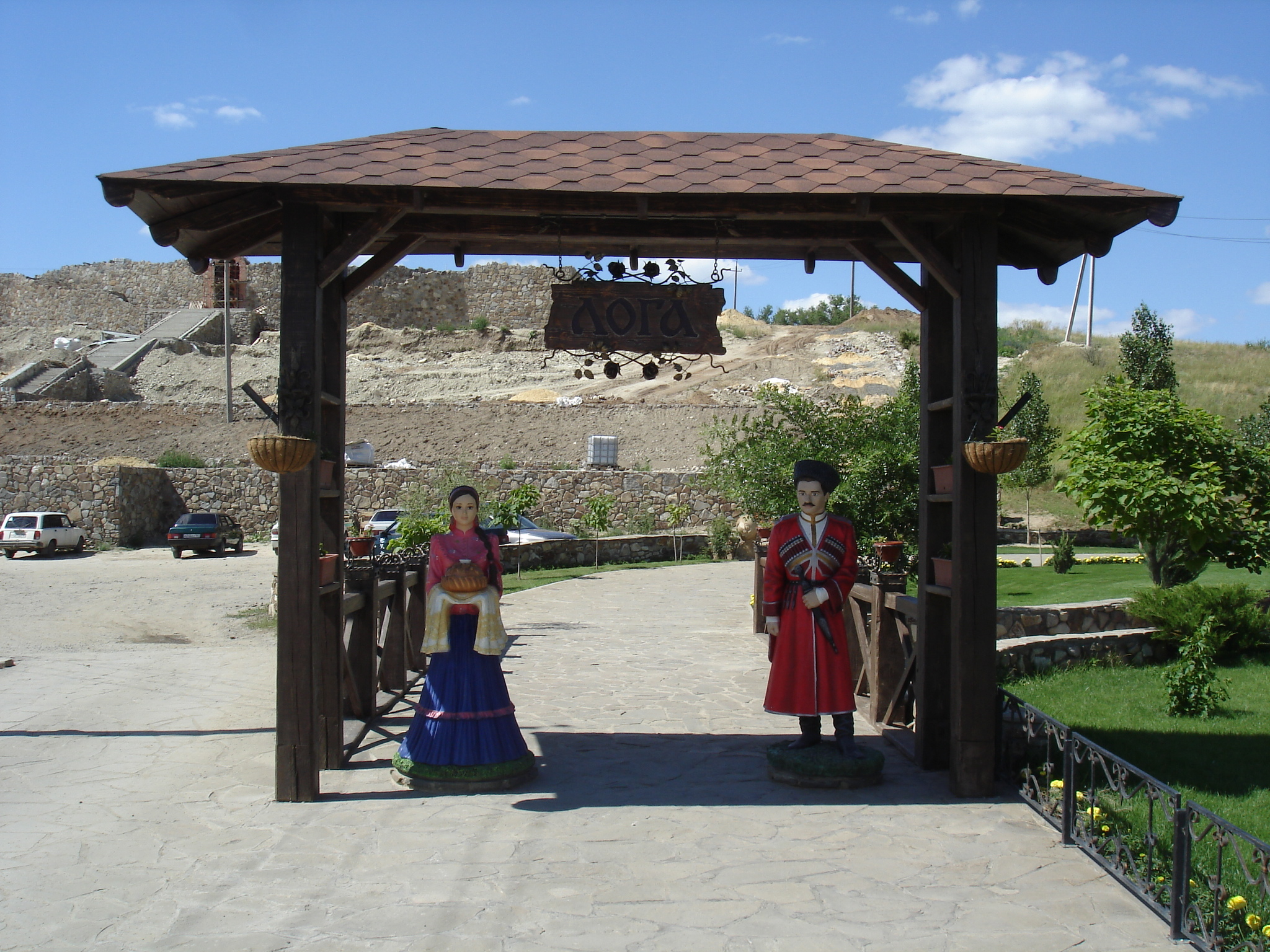
- Interactive map of Loga Park
- Location: Staraya Stanica, Rostov Oblast, Russia
- Open: 2012

Loga Park (Russian: Парк Логá) is a European-style landscape park situated in Khutor Staraya Stanitsa of Kamensk-Shakhtinsky City in the Rostov region of Russia. Its name came from the Logo beam in which floodplain it is situated.

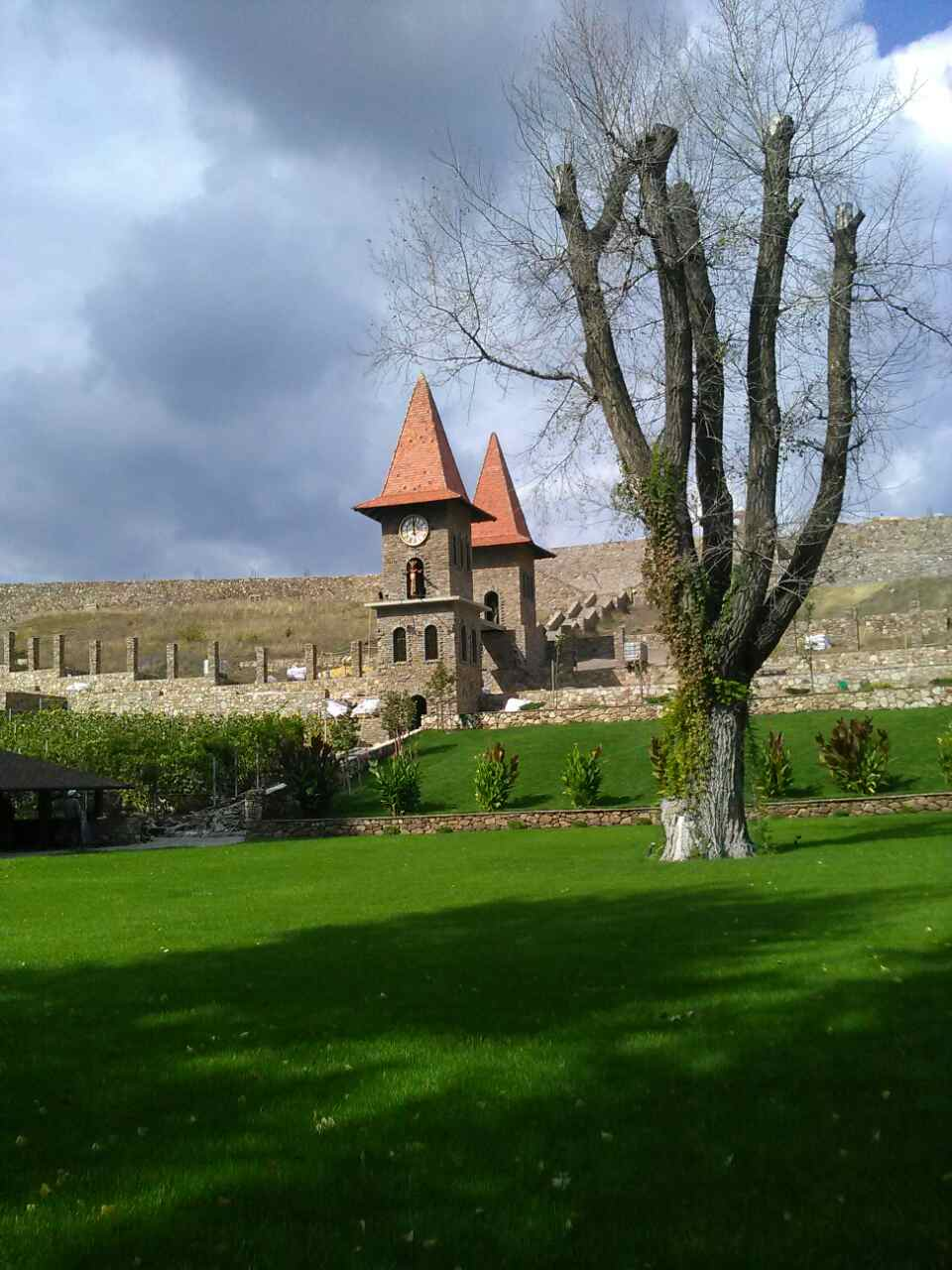
The Loga Park

== History ==
The Loga Park was created by a local businessman in a droughty region in a former dump site and opened in 2012.

== Landscape design ==
The park is an example of modern garden art and received a local unofficial name Little Switzerland for its picturesque view. Originally the Loga Park occupied an area of 16 hectares, and was subsequently expanded to 22 hectares.

== Admission and opening times ==
Admission is free.

== Present day ==
Every day the staff of 40 people including professional landscape designers work in the park.

In 2016, the park was visited by the governor of the Rostov region Vasily Golubev, who promised to support the park and build a separate road to it from the highway M-4 Don. The entry is from the Don highway through the junction following signpost to the Old Stanitsa.
