= Lotan Baba =

Indian holy man

Mohan Das, more commonly known as Lotan Baba (or "rolling saint") (ca. 1950 – September 2022) was an Indian holy man promoting peace by rolling his body along the ground when he travels. He claimed to have covered 30,000 kilometers (19,000 mi) to various cities in India, first setting off from his hometown Ratlam, in Madhya Pradesh. Witnesses report Mohan travelled on average roughly 10 to 12 kilometres (six to eight miles) a day rolling on the ground, at times smoking a cigarette while in motion. Media reports indicate Mohan Das began his life as a mystic after leaving home at age 12, and once undertook penance for 7 years by standing in one place and eating grass.

Mohan Das gained media attention in 2004 in his attempts to cross the border between Pakistan and India. Officials of the Border Security Force and immigration department near Wagah insisted he will need to acquire a passport and visa in order to continue his journey, of which he has neither. "I am not a politician who requires a passport or visa to visit another country. The government should understand that and give me permission," he said. Lotan Baba stated his intentions were to visit the Sikh shrine of Nankana Sahib, the birthplace of the first Sikh Guru Nanak Dev, and other religious places in Pakistan.

He held a Guinness record for longest rolling at about 9,846 miles (15,846 km).
