= Logar (surname) =

Logar is a Slovenian surname. Notable people with the surname include:

- Anže Logar (born 1976), Slovenian politician
- Eva Logar (born 1991), Slovenian ski jumper
- Lojze Logar (1944–2014), Slovenian painter and graphic artist
- Mihovil Logar (1902–1998), Serbian composer
- Theresa Logar (born 1985), American tennis player
- Tine Logar (1916–2002), Slovenian linguist
