= Spitzerberg (nature reserve) =

Australian nature reserve

Coordinates: 48.124091°N 16.936238°E

- IUCN category IV (habitat/species management area)
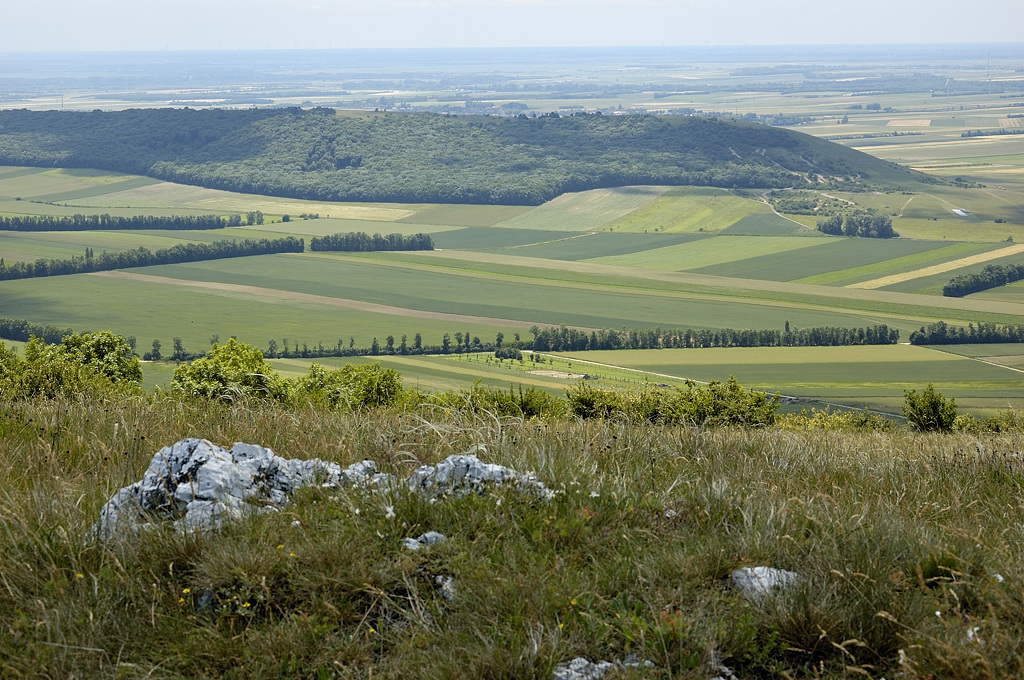
- Interactive map of Spitzerberg
- Area: 226 km^{2} (87 sq mi)
- Established: 1981

Spitzerberg is a nature reserve in the Austrian municipality of Prellenkirchen in the province of Lower Austria. It forms one of the biggest nature reserves of Lower Austria and is located on the Spitzerberg, the southern extension of the Hundsheimer Berge. The nature reserve has an IUCN category IV protection level and is part of the Natura 2000 area Hundsheimer Berge. The area is covered by rock steppes, dry and half dry grasslands and dry forests. The steep slopes of the Spitzerberg consist of limestone and dolomite. In combination with the very thin humus layer, this creates an extremely dry environment. From 2004 till 2008 the Spitzerberg nature reserve was part of the LIFE-Nature-project Pannonische Steppen- und Trockenrasen.

== Flora ==
Among the species to be found in the nature reserve is the Artemisia pancicii.

== Fauna ==
Remarkable animals living in the nature reserve are the clouded Apollo and the European ground squirrel.
