= Louze, Pakistan =

Louze, also spelt Loas, is a small village located near the district headquarters of Astore in Astore District of Gilgit Baltistan, Pakistan. It has apple orchards, and a hydroelectric power station that supplies power to most parts of Astore. The valley is used to grow a wide variety of apples, cherries, almonds, nuts and grapes.
