= Letter of Agency =

A Letter of Agency (LOA) is a document authorizing a telecommunications provider to act on a consumer's behalf. Some vendors may also call this a Letter of Authorization, however this is an incorrect name and Letter of Agency is the official term used in FCC documentation and Federal Statute. This is generally required in the United States when switching a telephone service provider while keeping the current telephone number or any other service which requires transfer of information from one provider to another. The regulations governing this are maintained by the Federal Communications Commission.
