= Bob Loga =

American stock car racing official (1940–1996)

- Born: 1940
- Died: April 27, 1996; Birmingham, Alabama, U.S.
- Cause of death: Automobile accident
- Occupation: Businessman
- Organization: Automobile Racing Club of America
- Title: Co-President; President
- Term: 1981–1990; 1990–1996
- Predecessor: John Marcum
- Successor: Ron Drager
- Spouse: Cora
- Children: 3

Robert John Loga (1940 – April 27, 1996) was an American stock car racing official, and was the president of the Automobile Racing Club of America (ARCA) between 1990 and 1996.

== Career ==
A resident of Temperance, Michigan, Loga joined ARCA as an official in 1962, and had been promoted to assist in leading the sanctioning body in 1981, along with Rollo Juckette, becoming president of the organisation in 1990.

== Death ==
On April 26, 1996, Loga was involved in an automobile accident while leaving Talladega Superspeedway. He died the following afternoon at the University of Alabama Birmingham Medical Center. ARCA annually awards the Bob Loga Memorial Scholarship in his honor.
