= Loka (disambiguation) =

Loka (Sanskrit: लोक) means world, dimension, plane, abode, and/or place or plane of existence. It is found in Hinduism, Buddhism and Jainism, each which have distinct conceptions of a trailokya.

Loka may also refer to:

== Places in Slovenia ==
- Frankolovo, a settlement in the Municipality of Vojnik (known as Loka ob Tesnici until 1955)
- Iška Loka, a settlement in the Municipality of Ig
- Loka, Šentjernej, a settlement in the Municipality of Šentjernej
- Loka, Starše, a settlement in the Municipality of Starše
- Loka, Tržič, a settlement in the Municipality of Tržič
- Loka, Koper, a settlement in the Municipality of Koper
- Loka pri Dobrni, a settlement in the Municipality of Dobrna
- Loka pri Framu, a settlement in the Municipality of Rače-Fram
- Loka pri Mengšu, a settlement in the Municipality of Mengeš
- Loka pri Zidanem Mostu, a settlement in the Municipality of Sevnica
- Loka pri Žusmu, a settlement in the Municipality of Šentjur
- Mala Loka, Trebnje, a settlement in the Municipality of Trebnje
- Škofja Loka, a town and a municipality (known locally as Loka)
- Stara Loka, part of the town of Škofja Loka
- Velika Loka, Grosuplje, a settlement in the Municipality of Grosuplje
- Velika Loka, Trebnje, a settlement in the Municipality of Trebnje

== Other places ==
- Lokaloka, Suriname, a village in Suriname

== Other uses ==
- "Loka" (song), by Simone & Simaria, 2017

== See also ==
- Lhoka, now Shannan, a city in Tibet
- Lhokä language or Sikkimese, a Southern Tibetic language
- Loga (disambiguation)
- Loca (disambiguation)
- Loko (disambiguation)
- Lota (name)
