= Lotan, son of Seir =

Lotan (Hebrew: לוֹטָן, Lōṭān), the eldest son of Seir the Horite, was the first-listed of seven chiefs of the Horites in the land of Seir in Genesis 36, a book of the Hebrew Bible and the Christian Old Testament. He had two sons, Hori and Hemam.

Lotan's sister Timna was a concubine of Esau's son Eliphaz; she gave birth to Amalek, although it is possible that the text here refers to two different people called Timna.

The kibbutz Lotan in Israel is named after him.

== Sources ==
- Butler, Trent C. Editor.. "Entry for 'LOTAN'". "Holman Bible Dictionary". <http://www.studylight.org/dic/hbd/view.cgi?number=T3926>. 1991.
- Orr, James, M.A., D.D. General Editor. "Entry for 'TIMNA'". "International Standard Bible Encyclopedia". <http://www.studylight.org/enc/isb/view.cgi?number=T8786>. 1915.
- Orr, James, M.A., D.D. General Editor. "Entry for 'LOTAN'". "International Standard Bible Encyclopedia". <http://www.studylight.org/enc/isb/view.cgi?number=T5583>. 1915.
- Genesis 36
- I Chronicles 1:38
