= Living on the Edge (Stéphane Pompougnac album) =

Studio album by Stéphane Pompougnac
- Released: November 25, 2003; August 3, 2004 (Canada)
- Genre: House, lounge, trip hop
- Length: 63:52 (13 tracks); 69:55 (14 tracks)
- Label: Pschent, Isla Del Sol (Canada)
- Producer: Stéphane Pompougnac

Stéphane Pompougnac chronology
Living on the Edge (2003)	Hello Mademoiselle (2007)

Living on the Edge is the first studio album by French DJ Stéphane Pompougnac.

In Thailand, Pompougnac held a launch party for the album and Hôtel Costes, Vol. 6 on March 2, 2004, at the Si Lom Road Sofitel in Bangkok. In Canada, the album was released on August 3, 2004, by Isla Del Sol.

== Track listing ==
1. "Pour Faire le Portrait d'un Oiseau" (texte dit par Yves Montand)
2. "Clumsy" (featuring Michael Stipe)
3. "Double Beat"
4. "Morenito" (featuring Clémentine)
5. "Living on the Edge"
6. "Loulou de Pomérane"
7. "PNC aux Portes"
8. "Fog"
9. "Fast and Loud" (featuring Juliette Oz)
10. "Petit Pompoupou"
11. "One Soul Rising" (featuring Cathy Battistessa)
12. "Closer to Julie"

=== Bonus track ===
13. "Morenito" (Bossa mix)

=== Japan bonus tracks ===
13. "Morenito" (Charles Schillings and Sanz remix radio edit)
14. "Closer to Julie" (Dublex Inc. remix)
