= Lotan, Israel =

Kibbutz in southern Israel

Lotan: לוטן (Hebrew); لوتان (Arabic)
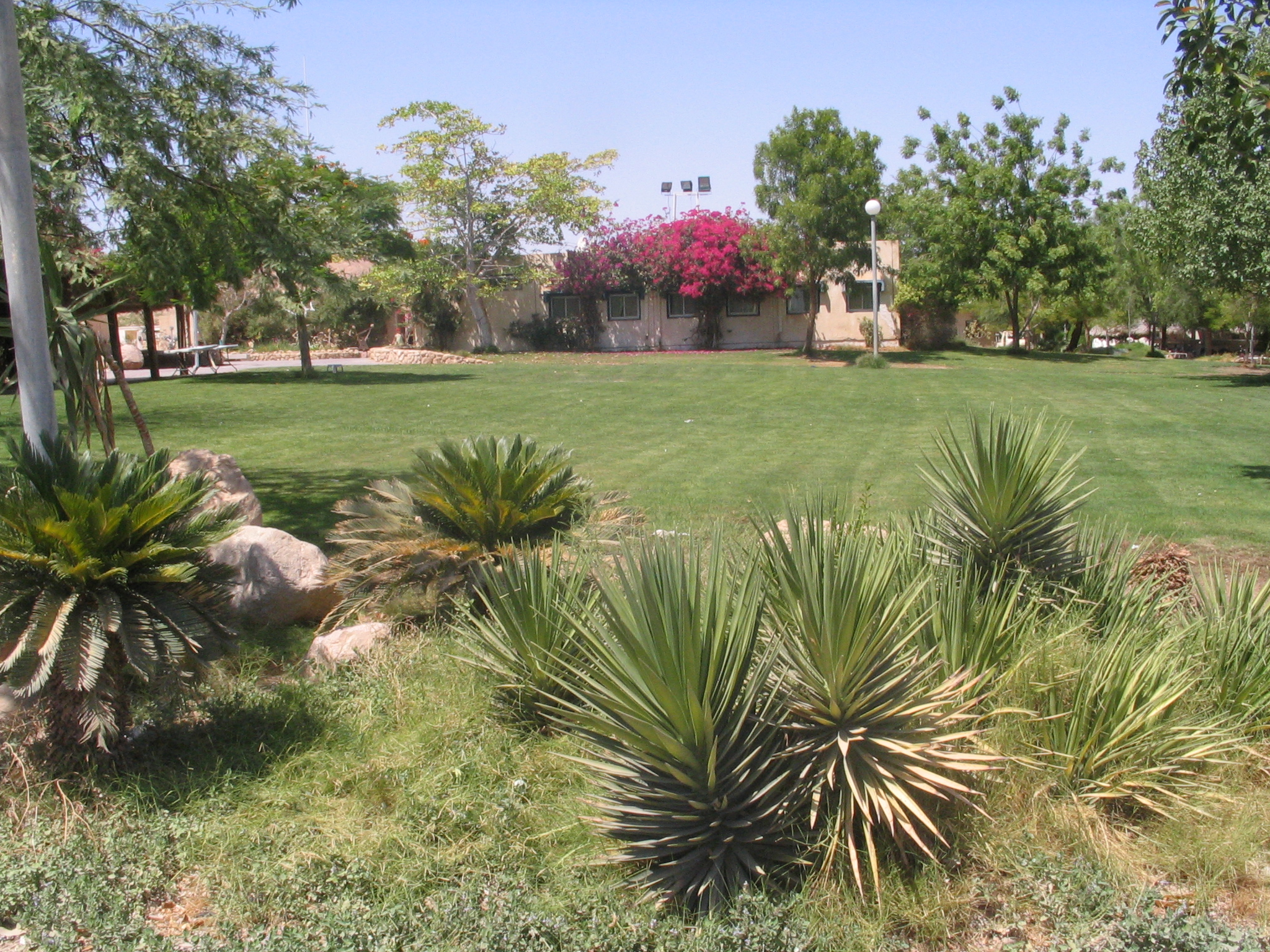

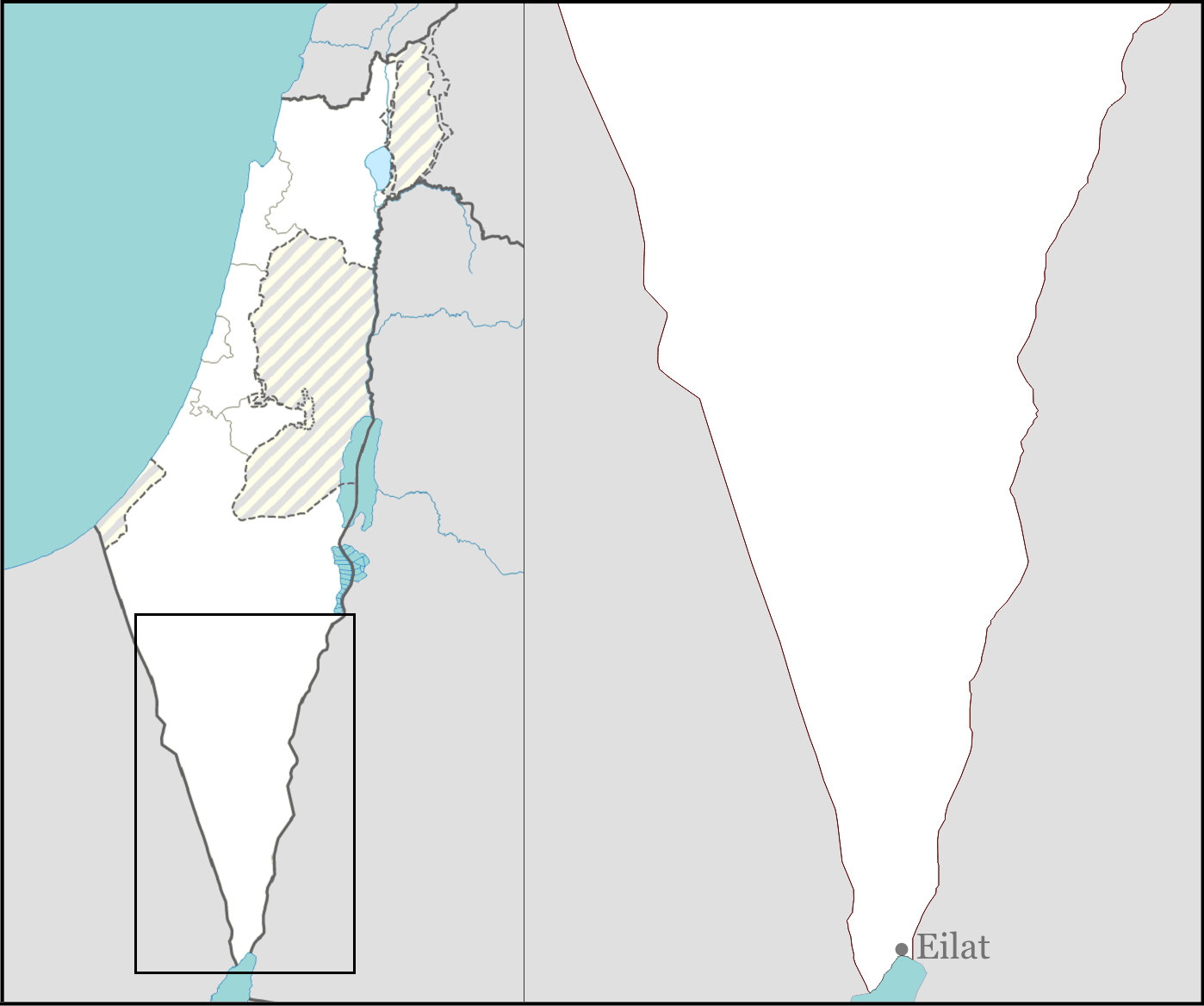
- Location within Southern Negev region of Israel
- Coordinates: 29°59′8″N 35°5′18″E
- Country: Israel
- District: Southern
- Subdistrict: Beersheba
- Council: Hevel Eilot
- Affiliation: Kibbutz Movement
- Founded: 1983
- Founder: it is the second kibbutz founded by the Reform Movement
- Population (2024): 270

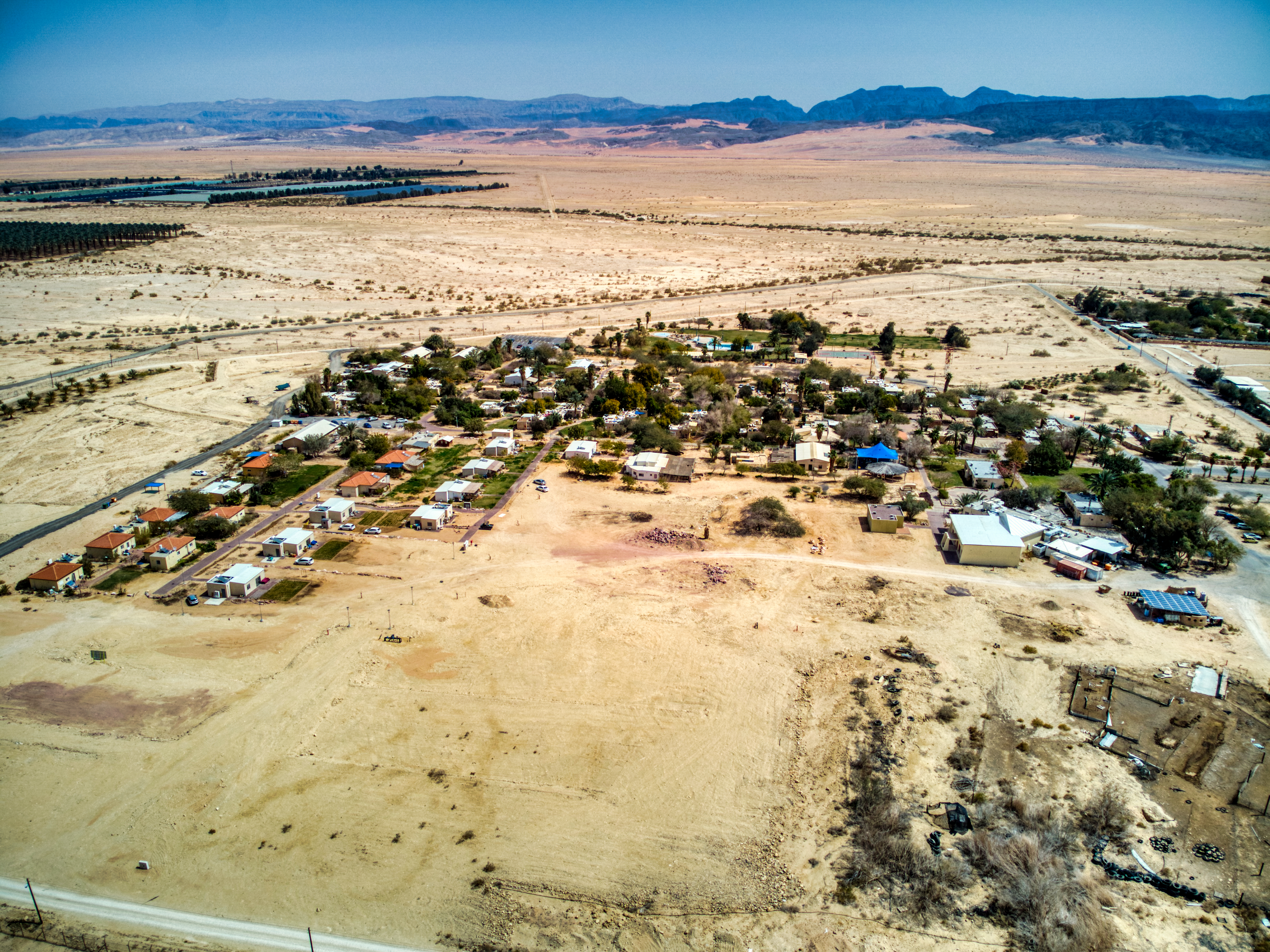
Lotan

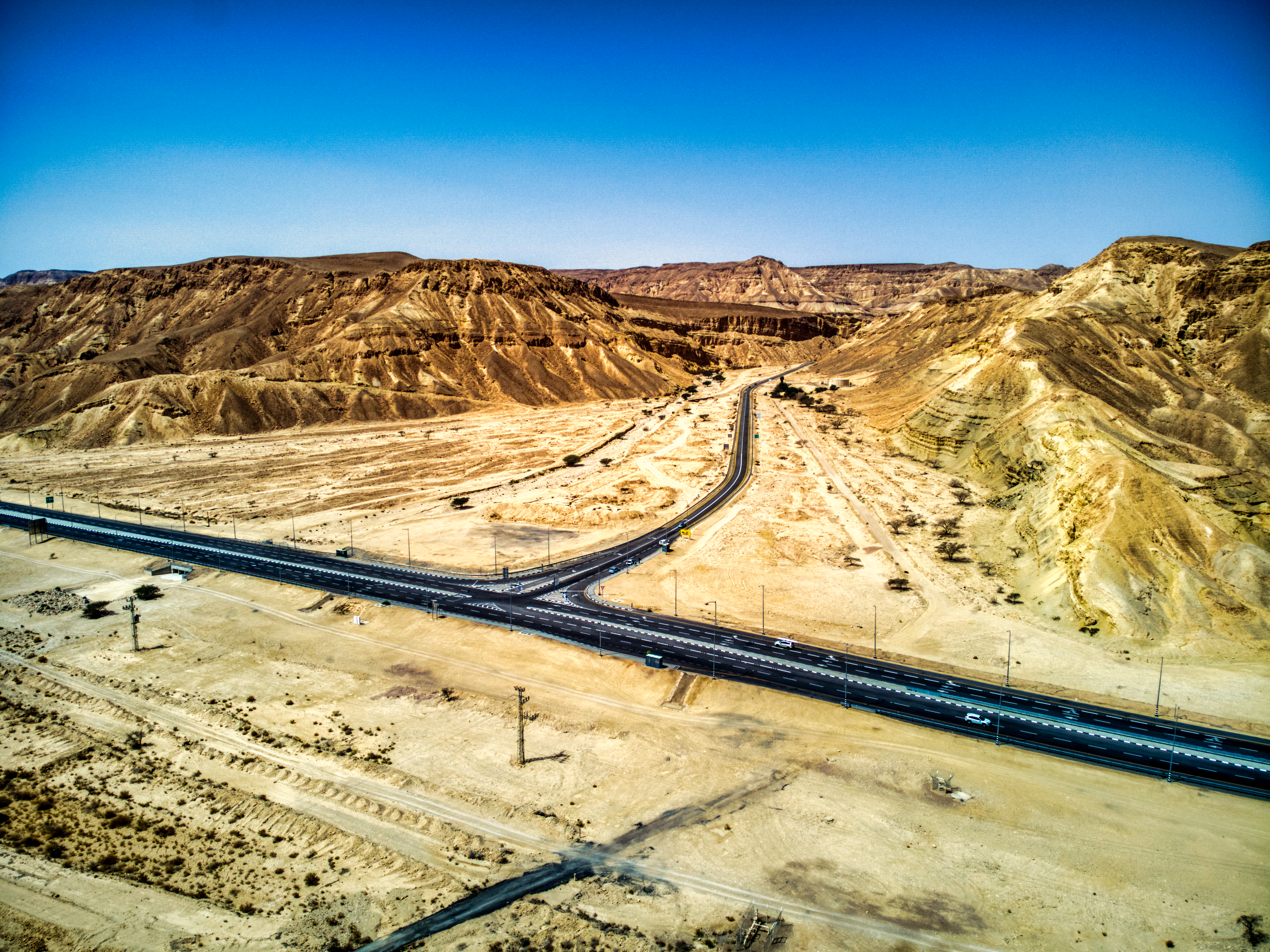
Ketura Junction, near Lotan, connecting Highway 40 and Highway 90

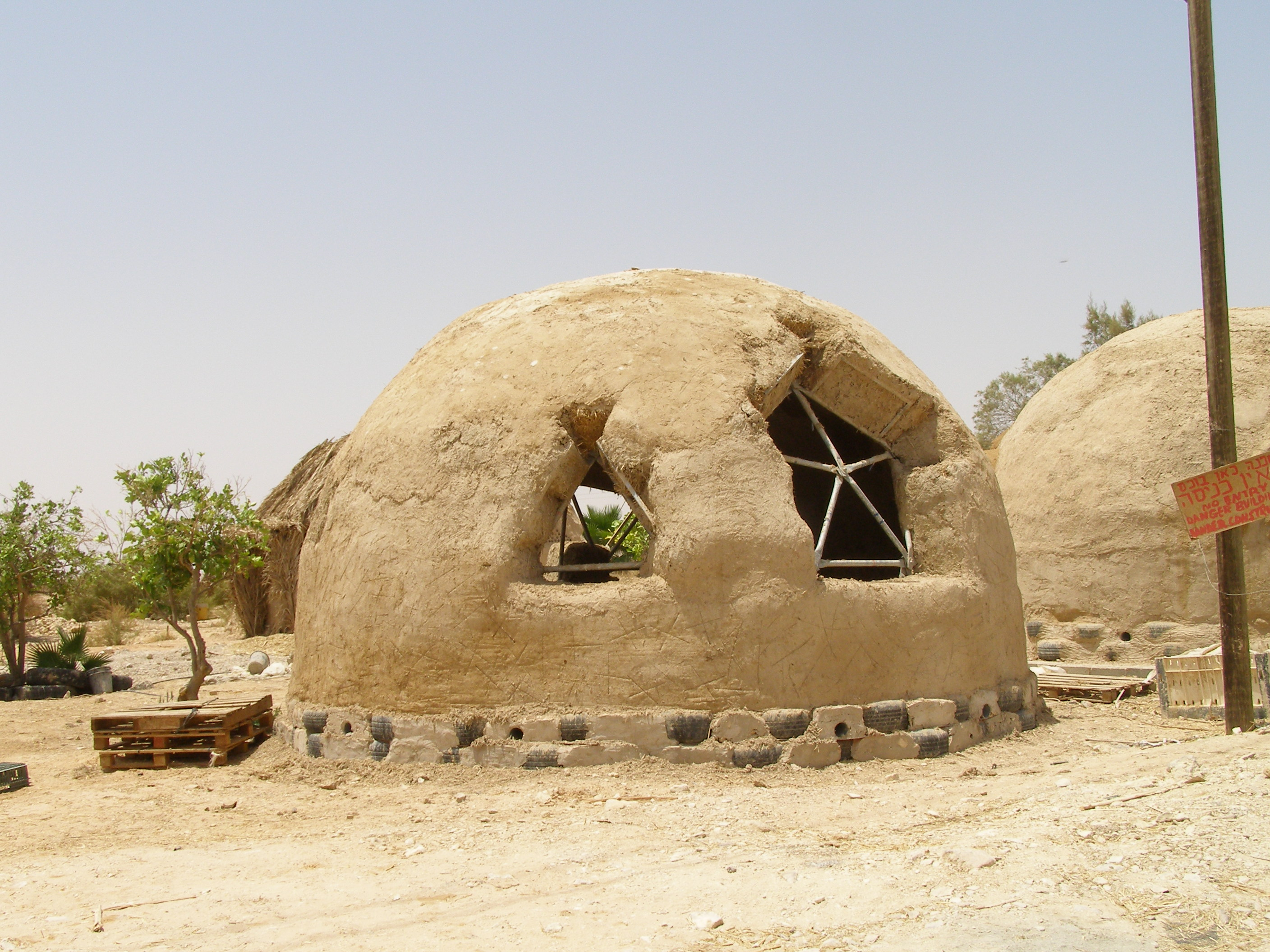
A dome house in Lotan, made of straw bales covered with earth plaster

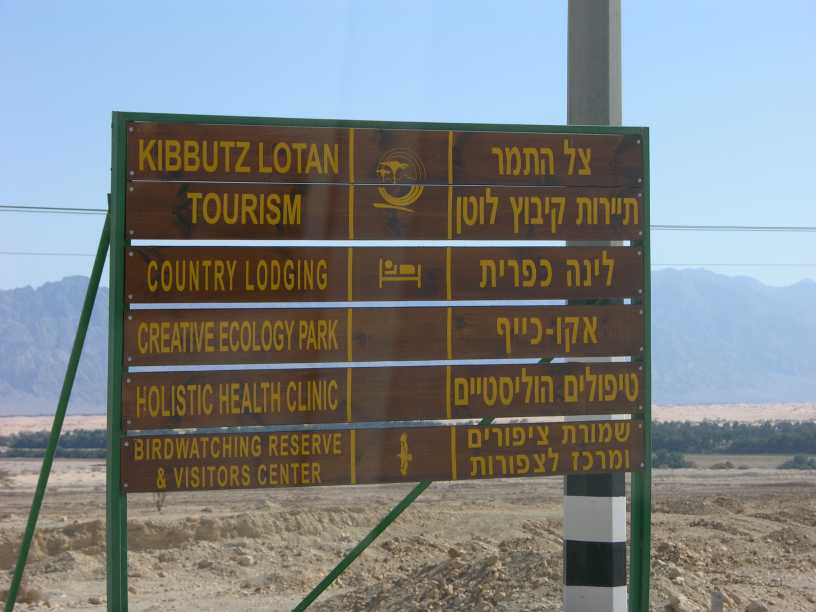
Attractions in Lotan

Kibbutz Lotan (Hebrew: לוֹטָן) is a Reform kibbutz in southern Israel. Located in the Arabah Valley in the Negev desert, it falls under the jurisdiction of Hevel Eilot Regional Council. The kibbutz is located 55 km from Eilat. In 2024 it had a population of 270. Kibbutz Lotan covers about 2,220 dunams.The kibbutz is a member of the Israel Movement for Reform and Progressive Judaism and the Global Ecovillage Network.

== History ==
Lotan is the second Reform kibbutz established by the Reform Jewish Movement. The kibbutz was founded in 1983 by idealistic Israeli and American youths who together built a profit sharing community based on pluralistic, egalitarian and creative Jewish values while protecting the environment. The name of the kibbutz derives from Lotan, "one of the sons of Seir the Horite". (Genesis 36:20; a descendant of Esau, who lived in Edom nearby).

== Economy ==
Income is generated by growing Medjool and Dekel Noir dates, dairy cows for milk and an Eco education branch, member's incomes from work throughout the region and ecotourism including birdwatching and the Green Apprenticeship program.

The kibbutz's Center for Creative Ecology is an environmental education, research and conservation institution. The Center offers academic programs and certification courses in permaculture, sustainable design and training. Facilities include an Eco-kef playground, an interactive park for organic and urban agriculture, natural building and solar energy demonstrations as well as the energy-efficient EcoCampus, a neighborhood constructed from earth-plastered straw bales. In addition to the EcoCampus, tourists have the option of staying at the kibbutz's Desert Travel Hotel.
