= Thomas Lote (MP fl. 1380–1390) =

English politician

Thomas Lote (fl. 1380–1390), of Chippenham, was an English politician.

He may have been related to Thomas Lote, MP for Chippenham in 1363.

He was a Member (MP) of the Parliament of England for Chippenham in January 1380, October 1382, February 1383, 1385, September 1388 and January 1390.
