= Lothario =

Male seducer of women

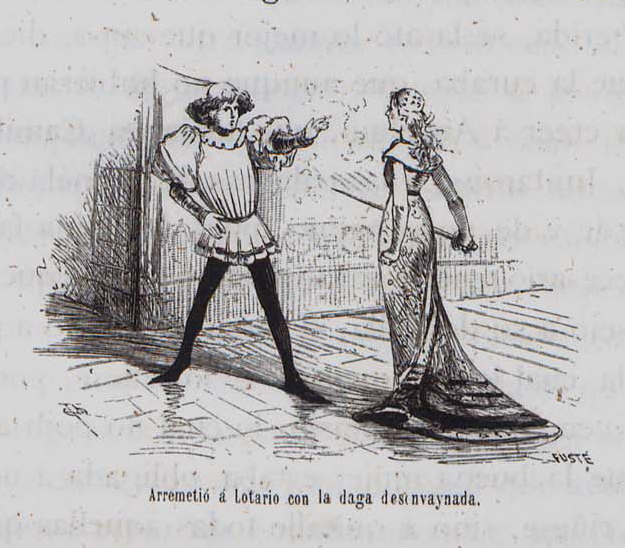
Camilla threatens Lothario with a sword. Illustration by Apeles Mestres, engraving by Francisco Fusté.

Lothario is a name used as shorthand for an unscrupulous seducer of women, based upon a character in The Fair Penitent, a 1703 tragedy by Nicholas Rowe. In Rowe's play, Lothario is a libertine who seduces and betrays Calista; and his success is the source for the proverbial nature of the name in the subsequent English culture. The Fair Penitent itself was an adaptation of The Fatal Dowry (1632), a play by Philip Massinger and Nathan Field. The name Lothario was previously used for a somewhat similar character in The Cruel Brother (1630) by William Davenant. A character with the same name also appears in The Ill-Advised Curiosity, a story within a story in Miguel de Cervantes' 1605 novel, Don Quixote, Part One, however the "Lothario" there is most unwilling to seduce his friend's wife and only does so upon the urging of the former, who recklessly wants to test her fidelity. Lothario is also the name of a rakish ex-priest featured in Charles Beckingham's 1728 poem "Sarah the Quaker to Lothario", whose perfidy drives his lover, Sarah, to suicide.

It was first mentioned in the modern sense in 1756 in The World, the 18th century London weekly newspaper, No. 202 ("The gay [meaning joyful, merry] Lothario dresses for the fight"). Samuel Richardson used "haughty, gallant, gay Lothario" as the model for the self-indulgent Robert Lovelace in his novel Clarissa (1748), and Calista suggested the character of Clarissa Harlowe. Edward Bulwer-Lytton used the name allusively in his 1849 novel The Caxtons ("And no woman could have been more flattered and courted by Lotharios and lady-killers than Lady Castleton has been"). Anthony Trollope in Barchester Towers (1857) wrote of "the elegant fluency of a practised Lothario".

Because of the allusive use the name sometimes is not capitalised.

== See also ==
- Giacomo Casanova
- Don Juan
- Lotario (name)
- Rakehell

== Sources ==
- The World, No. 157-209. The British Essayists in Forty-Five Volumes. Vol. XXIX. London: 1823. Includes a reprint of the No. 202 issue of The World, November 11, 1756.
