= Lothar Spranger =

East German footballer

Personal information
- Place of birth: Leipzig, Weimar Republic
- Position: Goalkeeper

Senior career*
| Years | Team | Apps | (Gls) |
| 1953–1957 | Lokomotive Leipzig | | |
| 1960–1961 | Kreuzlingen | | |
| 1962–1963 | Toronto Olympia | | |
| 1963–1965 | Germania | | |
| 1966 | Montebello | | |
| 1967 | Los Angeles Toros | 14 | (0) |
| 1968–1978 | Montebello Armenians | | |
- * Club domestic league appearances and goals

Lothar Spranger is a German former footballer who played as a goalkeeper.

== Career ==
Spranger played in the DDR-Oberliga in the 1950s with 1. FC Lokomotive Leipzig for five seasons. In 1957, he received a short-term travel visa to West Germany and as result defected. In 1960, he played abroad in Switzerland with FC Kreuzlingen and played with the organization for two seasons. In 1961, he continued his career this time in North America where he played in Canada's National Soccer League with Toronto Olympia for the 1962 season. He would re-sign with Toronto for the 1963 season.

For the remainder of the 1963 season, he played in the Greater Los Angeles Soccer League with Germania. He furthered his soccer career in Southern California by playing with Germania for an additional two seasons. In 1966, he played in the Continental Soccer League with Montebello. The following season he signed with Los Angeles Toros of the National Professional Soccer League. He originally was signed as a backup keeper for Blagoje Vidinić but became the starting goalkeeper after Vidinic sustained an injury for the majority of the season. He would make 14 appearances for Los Angeles.

In 1968, he returned to the Greater Los Angeles League to play with Montebello Armenians and was named to the All-Star team. Spranger featured in the 1969 National Challenge Cup final but Montebello was defeated by reigning champions Greek American AA. He was named once more to the All-Star team for the 1970 season. He played his final season in the Greater Los Angeles Soccer League with Montebello in 1978.
