= Thomas Lote (MP fl. 1363) =

Member of the Parliament of England

Thomas Lote (fl. 1363) was an English politician and brewer.

He was a Member (MP) of the Parliament of England for Chippenham in 1363.

He may have been related to the later MP for Chippenham, also named Thomas Lote.
