= Chlothar =

- Gender: Masculine

Origin
- Origin: Germanic
- Meaning: "Famous warrior"
- Region of origin: Europe

Other names
- Related names: Lothar

Chlothar (Latin Chlotharius; Greek Khlōthários Χλωθάριος; French Clotaire) is a Germanic given name, attested in Old English as Hloþhere, in Old High German as Lothari (Lothair, Lothar), and reconstructed in Frankish as *Hlodhari. It means "famous warrior", as a combination of the Germanic root hlut- (lauded, famous) and the word heri (army, warrior).

It can refer to the following kings of the Franks:

- Chlothar I (497–561)
- Chlothar II (584–629)
- Chlothar III (652–673)
- Chlothar IV (died 719)
