= Louis (given name) =

- Louis XIV, King of France (1643–1715)
- Pronunciation: /ˈluːi/ LOO-ee; US: /ˈluːɪs/ LOO-iss; French: [lwi]
- Gender: Male
- Language: French and English

Origin
- Origin: French
- Meaning: "Famed warrior" or "loot bringer"

Other names
- Derived: Louise
- Related names: Louie, Clovis, Lewis, Ludovico, Luigi, Luis, Ludvig, Ludwig, Ludwik, Lodewijk, Lodewyk, Alois
- See also: Lothar; Robert, name with a similar meaning

Louis is the French form of the Old Frankish given name Chlodwig and one of two English forms, the other being Lewis (/ˈluːɪs/).

== Etymology ==
The name Louis (through the intermediate form Clovis) is derived from the Frankish name ᚺᛚᛟᛞᛟᚹᛁᚷ (in runic alphabet) or *Hlōdowik or *Hlōdowig (in Latin alphabet). Traditionally, this name is considered to be composed of two elements, derived from both Proto-Germanic *hlūdaz ("loud, famous") and *wiganą ("to battle, to fight") respectively, resulting in the traditional practice of translating Clovis' name as meaning "famous warrior" or "famous in battle".

However, scholars have pointed out that Gregory of Tours consequently transcribes the names of various Merovingian royal names containing the first element as chlodo-. The use of a close-mid back protruded vowel (o), rather than the expected close back rounded vowel (u) which Gregory does use in various other Germanic names (i.e. Fredegundis, Arnulfus, Gundobadus, etc.) opens up the possibility that the first element instead derives from Proto-Germanic *hlutą ("lot, share, portion"), giving the meaning of the name as "loot bringer" or "plunder (bringing) warrior". This hypothesis is supported by the fact that if the first element is taken to mean "famous", then the name of Chlodomer (one of Clovis' sons) would contain two elements (*hlūdaz and *mērijaz) both meaning "famous", which would be highly uncommon within the typical Germanic name structure.

== Variant forms ==
- Afrikaans: Lodewyk, Ludwig, Louis
- Arabic: لويس
- Albanian: Luigj, Ludovik
- Ancient Germanic: Chlodovech, Clodovicus, Ludovicus, Clovis, Hludowig
- Armenian: Լուդովիկ (Loudovik)
- Basque: Aloxi, Koldobika, Luki, Koldo
- Breton: Loeiz, Loïc
- Bengali: লুইস, লুডউইগ, romanized: Luis/Luish, Luduig
- Bulgarian: Людовик (Lyudovik)
- Catalan: Lluís
- Chinese: 路易 (Lùyì)
- Croatian: Alojzije, Ljudevit, Ludovik, Luj, Alojz
- Czech: Ludvík, Alois, Luděk
- Danish: Ludvig, Lodvig
- Dutch: Lodewijk, Lode, Loe, Lowieke, Ludo
- English: Louis, Louie, Lou, Lewis, Lewes, Lewie, Lew, Lewy or Luey; Ludovic, Lodvig, Lodovig, Lutwidge
- Esperanto: Ludoviko, Luĉjo
- Faroese: Ludvík
- French: Louis, Ludovic, Clovis
- Galician: Lois, Luís
- Georgian: ხლოდვიგი (Khlodvigi), ლუდვიგი (ludvigi), ლუდოვიკო(ludoviko), ლუი (lui)
- German: Ludwig, Alois, Aloysius, Lutz
- Greek: Λουδοβίκος (Loudovíkos), Λοΐζος(Loizos)
- Hawaiian: Lui
- Hindi: लुइस (Lu'is)
- Hungarian: Lajos, Alajos
- Irish: Alaois, Alabhaois, Laoiseach, Lughaidh
- Indonesian: Aloysius, Louis, Ludowikus, Luis
- Icelandic: Loðvík
- Italian: Aloigi, Aloisio, Luigi, Lodovico, Ludovico, Gigi, Gigio, Gigino, Gino, Luigino, Vico
- Venetian: Alvise
- Lombard: Ginetto
- Japanese: ルイ(Rui)
- Korean: 루이 (Lui), 루이스 (Luiseu)
- Latin: Ludovicus, Aloysius
- Latvian: Ludviķis, Ludis, Ludvigs, Luijs, Luiss, Luī, Aloizs, Aloiss
- Lithuanian: Liudvikas, Aloyzas, Liudas
- Macedonian: Лудвиг (Ludvig), Луј (Luj), Људевит (Ljudevit)
- Medieval Occitan: Aloys, Aloysius
- Norwegian: Ludvig, Lodve
- Occitan: Loís
- Persian: لویی
- Polish: Ludwik, Alojzy
- Portuguese: Luís, Aloísio, Aluísio, Ludovico (Luiz is an archaic form), Luisinho
- Provençal: Louïs, Louei, Louvis
- Punjabi: ਲੂਯਿਸ (Lūyis)
- Romanian: Aloisiu, Ludovic
- Russian: Людовик (Lyudovik)
- Scottish Gaelic: Luthais
- Sicilian: Luiggi, Ludovicu
- Serbian: Луј (Luj), Људевит (Ljudevit)
- Slovak: Ľudovít, Alojz
- Slovene: Alojz, Lojze, Ljudevit, Luj, Alojzij, Ludvik
- Spanish: Luis, Ludovico
- Swedish: Ludvig, Love, Ludde
- Tamil: லூயிஸ் (Lūyis)
- Telugu: లూయిస్ (Lūyis)
- Thai: หลุยส์ (H̄luys̄̒)
- Ukrainian: Людовик (Lyudovyk)
- Welsh: Lewis, Lewys

== Feminine variants ==
- Arabic: لويز
- Belarusian: Луіза (Luiza)
- Chinese Simplified: 路易丝 (Lùyìsī)
- Chinese Traditional: 路易絲 (Lùyìsī)
- Croatian: Alojzija
- Danish: Louise
- Dutch: Louisa, Louise, Ludovica
- English: Louise, Louisa, Lou, Louella, Lula, Luella, Lulu, Lua
- Estonian: Loviise
- Finnish: Loviisa
- French: Lou, Louise, Louisette
- German: Aloisia, Louisa, Luise, Lulu, Luisa
- Greek: Λουίζα (Louíza)
- Gujarati: લુઇસ (Lu'isa)
- Hebrew: לואיז
- Hindi: लुइस (Lu'isa)
- Hungarian: Lujza
- Italian: Lodovica, Ludovica, Luigia, Luisa, Gigia, Gina, Ginetta, Luigina, Luisella
- Japanese: ルイーザ (Ruīza), ルイ (Rui)
- Kannada: ಲೂಯಿಸ್ (Lūyis)
- Korean: 루이사 (Luisa)
- Lithuanian: Liudvika
- Maori: Ruiha
- Macedonian: Лујза (Lujza), Лојза (Lojza)
- Mongolian: Луиза (Luiza)
- Nepali: लुइस (Lu'isa)
- Norwegian: Lovise
- Persian: لوئیس
- Polish: Ludwika, Luiza
- Portuguese: Luisa, Luiza
- Romanian: Luiza
- Serbian: Луиз (Luiz)
- Slovak: Alojzia
- Slovene: Alojzija
- Spanish: Luisa, Luisana, Luisel, Luisina, Luisita
- Swedish: Lovisa, Lova
- Tamil: லூயிஸ் (Lūyis)
- Telugu: లూయిస్ ( Lūyis)
- Thai: หลุยส์ (H̄luys̄̒)
- Ukrainian: Луїза (Luyiza)
- Urdu: لوئیس

== Arts and entertainment ==
- Louis (singer) (1952–2011), Serbian singer
- Louis Anthony deLise (born 1949), American composer, arranger, and record producer
- Louis Akin (1868–1913), American painter and illustrator
- Lou Albano (1933–2009), Italian wrestler, manager and actor
- Louie Anderson (1953–2022), American stand-up comedian and actor
- Louis Armstrong (1901–1971), American jazz musician
- Louis Bannet (1911–2002), Dutch trumpeter
- Louis C.K. (born 1967), American comedian
- Louis Cachet (born 1973), Norwegian musician
- Louis Calabro (1926–1991), Italian American orchestral composer
- Louis Calhern (1895–1956), American actor
- Louis Cheung (born 1980), Hong Kong singer, songwriter, and actor
- Louis Clark (1947–2021), English musical arranger and keyboard player
- Louis Cole (born 1983), English YouTuber
- Louis Cole (born 1986), American musician
- Lou Costello (1906–1959), American comedian
- Louis Daguerre (1787–1851), French artist and photographer
- Louis Deland (1772–1823), Swedish ballet dancer, singer, actor, choreographer and ballet master
- Lou Dobbs (1945–2024), CNN anchor
- Louis C. Elson (1848–1920), music critic, music historian, author, composer, editor, journalist, and professor of music theory
- Lou Ferrigno (born 1951), American bodybuilder and actor
- Louis Edwin Fry Sr. (1903–2000), American architect and professor
- Louis Gallodier (1734–1803), ballet master and choreographer
- Louis Gossett Jr. (1936–2024), American actor
- Louis Hughes (1832–1913), American author
- Louis Johnson (bassist) (1955–2015), American bass player and singer, member of The Brothers Johnson
- Louis Jordan (1908–1975), pioneering American jazz, blues and rhythm & blues musician and songwriter
- Louis Jourdan (1921–2015), French actor
- Louis Jouvet (1887–1951), French actor and director
- Louis I. Kahn (1901–1974), American architect
- Louis Koo (born 1970), Hong Kong actor, singer and film producer
- Louis L'Amour (1908–1988), American author of Western fiction
- Louis Logic, American underground rapper
- Louis Masreliez (1748–1810), French-born Swedish painter and interior designer
- Louis Pearl (born 1958), American entertainer, known as "The Amazing Bubble Man"
- Louis Prima (1910–1978), Italian American jazz and swing musician and trumpeter
- Louis Rukeyser (1933–2006), American economic commentator
- Lou Diamond Phillips (born 1962), American actor
- Lou Rawls (1933–2006), American musician
- Lou Reed (1942–2013), American musician
- Louis Sachar (born 1954), American author of children's books
- Louis Spohr (1784–1859), German composer
- Louis Sullivan (1856–1924), American architect
- Louis Theroux (born 1970), British television broadcaster
- Louis Tomlinson (born 1991), English singer-songwriter.
- Louis Van Lint (1909–1986), Belgian artist
- Louis Vuitton (designer) (1821–1892), French fashion designer
- Louis Wain (1860–1936), British artist who drew cats
- Louis Walsh (born 1952), Irish entertainment manager
- Louis Yuen (born 1967), Hong Kong actor

== Politics ==
- Louis A. Bloom (1900–1988), Pennsylvania State Representative and Judge
- Louis Borno, President of Haiti during United States occupation of Haiti
- Louis Brandeis (1856–1941), American Supreme Court justice and Zionist leader
- Louis Philippe de Bombelles, Austrian count and diplomat
- Louis Conradt, politician from Texas, investigated by To Catch a Predator
- Louis DeJoy (born 1957), American businessman and current postmaster general of the United States
- Louis René Édouard, cardinal de Rohan (1734–1803), French religious leader and politician
- Louis Farrakhan (born 1933), Afro-American social leader
- Louis De Geer (1818–1896), Sweden's first prime minister; baron, statesman and writer
- Louis De Geer (1910–1987), Swedish diplomat
- Gerhard Louis De Geer, known as Louis De Geer (1854–1935), Swedish prime minister
- Louis "Louie" Gohmert (born 1953), Texas politician and U.S. Congressman
- Louis Lucien Hunter, Sri Lankan civil servant and politician
- Louis Alphonse Koyagialo, Prime minister of the Democratic Republic of Congo
- Louis St. Laurent (1882–1973), Canadian politician who served as the 12th prime minister of Canada
- Louis Lingg (1864–1887), German anarchist arrested after Haymarket Square bombing
- Louis Michel (born 1947), Belgian politician
- Louis Riel (1844–1885), Canadian politician, a founder of Manitoba, and leader of the Métis
- Louis Eugène Roy (1861–1939), President of Haiti
- Louis Waldman (1892–1982), Ukrainian-American lawyer and New York City politician
- Louis L. Winston (1784–1824), justice of the Supreme Court of Mississippi

== Royalty ==
=== Holy Roman Emperors and Kings of Germany ===
- Louis the Pious, Emperor and King of the Franks from 814 to his death.
- Louis II, Holy Roman Emperor, eldest son of the emperor Lothair I
- Louis III, Holy Roman Emperor, maternal grandson of the emperor Louis II
- Louis the German (Louis II), the third son of the emperor Louis the Pious and his first wife
- Louis the Child (Louis III), the last true Carolingian ruler of East Francia
- Louis IV, Holy Roman Emperor

=== Kings of France ===
- Louis the Pious, Emperor and King of the Franks from 814 to his death
- Louis the Stammerer, the eldest son of Charles the Bald and Ermentrude of Orléans
- Louis III of France, king of Western Francia
- Louis IV of France, king of France from 936 to 954
- Louis V of France, son of the Frankish King Lothair and his wife Emma
- Louis VI of France, King of France from 1108 to 1137
- Louis VII of France, King of France from 1137 to 1180
- Louis VIII of France, King of France from 1223 to 1226
- Louis IX of France, King of France from 1226 to 1270
- Louis X of France, King of France from 1314 to 1316
- Louis XI, King of France from 1461 to 1483
- Louis XII, King of France from 1498 to 1515
- Louis XIII, King of France and Navarre from 1610 to 1643
- Louis XIV, King of France and Navarre from 1643 to 1715
- Louis XV, King of France and Navarre from 1715 to 1774
- Louis XVI, King of France and Navarre from 1774 until 1791
- Louis XVII, the son of King Louis XVI of France and Marie Antoinette
- Louis XVIII, King of France and Navarre from 1815 to 1824
- Louis XIX, aka Louis Antoine, Duke of Angoulême, King of France and Navarre for twenty minutes in 1830 before his abdication
- Louis Philippe I, King of the French from 1830 to 1848

=== Other French royalty ===
- Louis (948–c. 954), Prince of France and son of King Louis IV of France
- Louis, Count of Évreux (1276–1319), Prince of France
- Louis of France (1264–1276), Prince of France and heir apparent of France
- Louis (1309–1328), Count of Chartres
- Louis I, Count of Nevers (1272–1322), Count of Nevers and Rethel
  - his son, Louis I, Count of Flanders (c. 1304–1346), Count of Flanders, Nevers and Rethel
- Louis I of Anjou (1339–1384), Prince of France and Duke of Anjou
- Louis Charles, Count of Beaujolais (1779–1808), "Louis Charles Alphonse Léodgard d'Orléans," Count of Beaujolais
- Louis I, Duke of Bourbon (1279–1341), "Louis the Lame," Duke of Bourbon
- Louis II, Duke of Bourbon (1337–1410), "Louis de Bourbon," "Louis the Good," Duke of Bourbon
- Louis, Duke of Guyenne (1397–1415), Dauphin of Viennois and Duke of Guyenne
- Prince Louis, Duke of Nemours (1814–1896), Prince Louis of Orléans, Duke of Nemours
- Louis I, Duke of Orléans (1372–1407), Duke of Orléans and Touraine
  - See also Louis d'Orléans
- Louis, Grand Dauphin (1661–1711), Prince of France
  - his son, Louis, Duke of Burgundy (1682–1712), "Petit Dauphin," Prince of France
- Louis Ferdinand (1729–1765), Dauphin of France
  - his son, Louis Joseph Xavier, Duke of Burgundy (1751–1761), Dauphin of France
- Louis I, Prince of Condé (1530–1569), "Louis I de Bourbon," Prince of Condé
- Louis, Grand Condé (1621–1686), "Louis II de Bourbon," "The Great Condé," Prince of Condé
- Louis III, Prince of Condé (1668–1710), Prince of Condé
- Louis Alexandre, Count of Toulouse (1678–1737)
- Louis de La Blaume Le Blanc (1667–1683), "Louis de Bourbon," "Légitimé de France," Count of Vermandois, "Louis of Vermandois"
- Louis Henri, Duke of Bourbon (1692–1740), "Louis Henri Joseph," "Louis IV," Prince de Condé
  - his son, Louis Joseph, Prince of Condé (1736–1818), "Louis Joseph de Bourbon," "Louis V Joseph," Prince de Condé
    - his son, Louis Henri, Prince of Condé (1756–1830), "Louis Henri Joseph de Bourbon," "Louis VI Henri," "Louis Henry II," Prince of Condé
- Louis Armand I, Prince of Conti (1661–1685), "Louis Armand de Bourbon," Prince of Conti
- Louis Armand II, Prince of Conti (1695–1727), "Louis Armand de Bourbon," Prince of Conti
  - his son, Louis François, Prince of Conti (1717–1776), "Louis François de Bourbon," "Louis François I," Prince of Conti
    - his son, Louis François Joseph, Prince of Conti (1734–1814), "Louis François Joseph de Bourbon," "Louis François II" Prince of Conti
- Louis V, Elector Palatine (1478–1544), "Ludwig V. von der Pfalz" Count Palatine of the Rhine
- Louis Joseph, Dauphin of France (1781–1789), "Louis Joseph Xavier François"
- Louis Philippe I, Duke of Orléans (1725–1785) "Louis the Fat," Duke of Orléans, Prince of France
  - his son, Louis Philippe II, Duke of Orléans (1747–1793), father of King Louis Philippe I
  - his great-grandson, Prince Philippe, Count of Paris (1838–1894)

=== Kings of Etruria ===
- Louis I of Etruria, King of Etruria from 1801 to 1803
- Louis II of Etruria, King from 1803 to 1807, also Duke of Lucca (1824–1847) and Duke of Parma (1847–1849)

=== Kings of Holland ===
- Louis I Bonaparte, King of Holland from 1806 to 1810
- Louis II Bonaparte, King of Holland in 1810, also Grand Duke of Berg

=== Kings of Hungary ===
- Louis the Great, (Louis I of Hungary) Apostolic King of Hungary, Dalmatia, Croatia, Rama, Serbia, Galicia, Lodomeria, Jerusalem and Sicily from 1342, King of Poland from 1370
- Louis II of Hungary and Bohemia, King of Bohemia and Hungary from 1516 to 1526

=== King of Portugal ===
- Louis I of Portugal (1838–1889), succeeded to his older brother Peter V in 1861

=== King of Spain ===
- Louis I of Spain, the eldest son of Philip V of Spain by his first Queen consort Maria Louisa of Savoy

=== Princes of Monaco ===
- Louis I, Prince of Monaco
- Louis II, Prince of Monaco, Sovereign Prince of Monaco from 26 June 1922 until 9 May 1949

=== Princes of the United Kingdom ===
- Prince Louis of Wales (born 2018), son of William, Prince of Wales, and Catherine, Princess of Wales, grandson of King Charles III

=== Dukes and Kings of Bavaria ===
- Louis I, Duke of Bavaria
- Louis II, Duke of Bavaria
- Louis III, Duke of Bavaria
- Louis IV, Holy Roman Emperor, also Duke of Bavaria
- Louis V, Duke of Bavaria, also Margrave of Brandenburg as Louis I
- Louis VI, Duke of Bavaria, also Margrave of Brandenburg as Louis II
- Louis VII, Duke of Bavaria
- Louis VIII, Duke of Bavaria
- Louis IX, Duke of Bavaria
- Louis X, Duke of Bavaria
- Louis I King of Bavaria from 1825 to 1848
- Louis II King of Bavaria from 1864 to 1886, the Märchenkönig (Fairy tale king)
- Louis III, Regent from 1912 to 1913, King from 1913 to 1918 (last king of Bavaria)

=== Grand-Duke of Berg ===
- Louis, Grand Duke of Berg from 1809 to 1813, also King of Holland as Louis II

=== Grand-Dukes of Hesse ===
- Louis I, Grand Duke of Hesse
- Louis II, Grand Duke of Hesse
- Louis III, Grand Duke of Hesse
- Louis IV, Grand Duke of Hesse

=== Duke of Savoy ===
- Louis, Duke of Savoy, Duke of Savoy from 1440 to 1465

=== Duke of Württemberg ===
- Louis Eugene, Duke of Württemberg

=== Landgrave of Hesse-Darmstadt ===
- Louis IX, Landgrave of Hesse-Darmstadt

== Science and innovation ==
- Louis Blériot (1872–1936), French aviator and inventor
- Louis Braille (1809–1852), inventor of braille
- Louis de Broglie (1892–1987), French physicist and Nobel Prize laureate
- Louis E. Brus (1943–2026), American chemist and Nobel Prize laureate
- Louis Ignarro (born 1941), American pharmacologist and Nobel Prize laureate
- Louis Leakey (1903–1972), British paleontologist
- Louis Lliboutry (1922–2007), French-Chilean glaciologist
- Louis Mink (1921–1983), American philosopher of history
- Louis Pasteur (1822–1895), French microbiologist and chemist, discoverer of the principles of vaccination, microbial fermentation and pasteurization
- Louis Le Prince (1841–disappeared 1890), French inventor, Father of Cinematography
- Louis Schoonhoven (born 1931), Dutch entomologist
- Louis Slotin (1910–1946), Canadian physicist and chemist
- Louis Wirth (1897–1952), American sociologist

== Sports ==
- Louis Almond (born 1992), English footballer
- Louis Babrow (1915–2004), South African rugby union player
- Louis Baise (1927–2020), South African Olympic wrestler
- Louis Bullard (1956–2010), American football player
- Louis Campbell (born 1979), American basketball player
- Louis Chevrolet (1878–1941), racing driver and the founder of the Chevrolet Motor Car Company
- Louis Unser (1896–1979), American race car driver and Hillclimb racer
- Louis Delétraz (born 1997), Swiss race car driver
- Louis Clarke (1901–77), American Olympic track champion
- Louis Ford (footballer) (1914–1980), Welsh footballer
- Louis van Gaal (born 1951), Dutch footballer and manager
- Louis Greene (born 1992), English professional boxer
- Louis Hubert (born 2007), French para-cyclist
- Louis Iglesias (born 2008), French racing driver
- Louis Jani (born 1957), Canadian judoka
- Louis Kaplan (1901–1970), nicknamed "Kid Kaplan", Russian-born American world champion Hall of Fame featherweight boxer
- Louis King (basketball) (born 1999), American basketball player
- Louis Klotz (1921–2014), nicknamed "Red", American NBA basketball player and owner of the Washington Generals and New York Nationals
- Louis Lundgren (1901–1976), Danish sprinter
- Louis Moore (American football) (born 2001), American football player
- Louis Pilot (1940–2016), Luxembourgian footballer and manager
- Louis Riddick (born 1969), American football broadcaster and former player
- Louis Rubenstein (1861–1931), Canadian world champion Hall of Fame figure skater
- Louis Saha (born 1978), French footballer
- Louis Sharp (born 2007), New Zealand racing driver
- Louis Smith (gymnast) (born 1989), English gymnast

== Other occupations ==
- Louis de Barth (1764–1844), Franco-American Roman Catholic priest
- Louis Edmund Blaze (1861–1951), Sri Lankan Burgher educationist, founder of Kingswood College, Kandy, Sri Lanka
- Louis Botha (1862–1919), South African politician, first Prime Minister of the Union of South Africa, one of the principal commanders of the Second Boer War
- Louis Brouillard (1921–2018), American Catholic priest
- Louis Congo (c. 1725), emancipated slave, appointed public executioner of Louisiana
- Louis Le Duff, French billionaire businessman
- Louis Franchet d'Espèrey, French general during World War I
- Louis V. Gerstner Jr. (born 1942), chairman and CEO of IBM
- Louis Antoine Godey (1804–1878), American editor and publisher
- Louis Jolliet (1645–1700), French explorer, one of the first Europeans to reach the northern part of the Mississippi River
- Louis Kealoha, former Chief of the Honolulu Police Department and convicted felon
- Louis-Frédéric Lescure (1904–1993), French industrialist
- Louis Mountbatten (1900–1979), last Viceroy of India and first Governor-General of independent India, cousin of Queen Elizabeth II
- Louis Palander (1842–1920), Swedish naval officer
- Louis Pio (1841–1894), Danish political figure
- Louis (parrot), parrot from Victoria, British Columbia, Canada, well-provided for by owner's will after her death in 1949
- Louis H. Pollak (1922–2012), American district court judge and dean of Yale Law School and the University of Pennsylvania Law School
- Louis Pope (b.1947), American businessman
- Louis Potgieter (1951–1991), German-South African singer
- Louis Claude Purser (1854–1932), Irish classical scholar
- Louis Ruquoy, Chief of Staff of the Belgian Army during the second part of the First World War
- Louis Sabunji (1838–1931), Syriac Catholic priest and journalist
- Louis B. Schwartz (1913–2003), American law professor at the University of Pennsylvania Law School
- Louis Segond (1810–1885), Swiss theologian
- Louis Spencer, Viscount Althorp (born 1994), heir apparent to earldom
- Louis Vuitton (1821–1892), French fashion designer and businessman
- Louis Zamperini (1917–2014), American World War II veteran, Christian evangelist and an Olympic distance runner, best known for being a Japanese POW survivor.

== Fictional characters ==
- Louis de Pointe du Lac, character in the Vampire Chronicles novels by Anne Rice
- Louis the Alligator, a character from the animated film The Princess and the Frog
- Louis Huang, character played by Randall Park in Fresh Off the Boat
- Louis Litt, character played by Rick Hoffman in Suits
- Louis Tully, character played by Rick Moranis in Ghostbusters and Ghostbusters II
- Louis Wu, character in the Ringworld books by Larry Niven
- Louis Guiabern, the main antagonist of Metaphor: ReFantazio
- Louis, one of the main protagonists of Left 4 Dead

== See also ==
- Lewis
- Lois
- Louis (disambiguation)
- Louise
- Louie
- Ludwig
- Luis
