= Louie =

Louie may refer to:

== Arts and entertainment ==
- Louie (American TV series), comedy drama television series created by and starring comedian Louis C.K.
- Louie (French TV series), animated series about a young rabbit who draws pictures which come to life
- "Louie" (song), by Blood Raw
- Louie (album), a 2022 album by Kenny Beats
- "Louie", a song by Ida Maria from Fortress Round My Heart

== People ==
- Louie (given name)
- Louie (surname)

== Mascots ==
- Louie the Bear, the St. Louis Blues mascot
- Louie the Laker, the Grand Valley State University mascot
- Louie the Lumberjack, the Northern Arizona University mascot
- Louie the Fly, the mascot for Australian insecticide Mortein

== Other uses ==
- "Louie", a slang term for a second lieutenant in the US Army

== See also ==
- Loui (disambiguation)
- Louis (disambiguation)
- Luis (disambiguation)
- Louise (disambiguation)
- Louie Louie (disambiguation)
