= Louis =

Louis may refer to:

== People ==
- Louis (given name), origin and several individuals with this name
- Louis (surname)
- Louis (singer), Serbian singer

== Other uses ==
- Louis (coin), a French coin
- HMS Louis, two ships of the Royal Navy
- Port Louis, the capital of Mauritius

== See also ==
Derived terms

- King Louis (disambiguation)
- Saint Louis (disambiguation)
- Louis Cruise Lines
- Louis dressing, for salad
- Louis Quinze, design style

Associated terms

- Lewis (disambiguation)
- Louie (disambiguation)
- Luis (disambiguation)
- Louise (disambiguation)
- Louisville (disambiguation)

Associated names

- Chlodwig, the origin of the name Ludwig, which is translated to English as "Louis"
- Ladislav and László - names sometimes erroneously associated with "Louis"
- Ludovic, Ludwig, Ludwick, Ludwik, names sometimes translated to English as "Louis"
