= Ludwig =

Ludwig may refer to:

== People ==
- Ludwig (given name), including a list of people and fictional characters
  - Ludwig Ahgren, a live streamer sometimes known mononymously as Ludwig
- Ludwig (surname), including a list of people

== Arts and entertainment ==
- "Ludwig", a 1967 song by Al Hirt
- Ludwig (film), 1973, by Luchino Visconti about Ludwig II of Bavaria
- Ludwig: Requiem for a Virgin King, a 1972 film by Hans-Jürgen Syberberg about Ludwig II of Bavaria
- Ludwig (1977 TV series), a British animated children's series
- Ludwig (2024 TV series), a British detective comedy drama series

== Other uses ==
- Ludwig (crater), a small lunar impact crater just beyond the eastern limb of the Moon
- Ludwig, Missouri, an unincorporated community in the US
- Ludwig Canal, an abandoned canal in southern Germany
- Ludwig Drums, an American manufacturer of musical instruments
- Ludwig (ship), a steamer that sank in 1861 after a collision with the Stadt Zürich

== See also ==
- Ludewig
- Ludvig
- Ludwik
- Ludwick
- Hedwig (disambiguation)
