= Loic (disambiguation) =

Loïc is a male given name.

Loic may also refer to:

- Low Orbit Ion Cannon, an open-source networking testing application
- An alternate dialectal pronunciation spelling of like

== See also ==
- Loich, Austria
- Dun Loich, Ireland
- Loik (disambiguation)
- Lois (disambiguation)
