= Ludowyk =

Ludowyk is a Sri Lankan Burgher surname, and is also used as a given name.

People with the name include:

== Surname ==
- Chris Ludowyk (born 1944), Sri Lankan-born Australian jazz trombonist and bandleader
- Edith Gyömrői Ludowyk (1896–1987), Hungarian-born psychotherapist who married E. F. C. Ludowyk
- Evelyn Frederick Charles Ludowyk (1906–1985), Shakespearean scholar, playwright, and academic
- Frederick Ludowyk (1934–2012), Sri Lankan-born Australian playwright, lexicographer, and editor of Ozwords magazine
- Geoff Ludowyk, member of The Wayfarers, an Australian folk group
- Natasha Ludowyk, co-founder and editor of defunct Is Not Magazine (2005–2008)
- Tristan Ludowyk, former member of The Bombay Royale, an 11-piece Australian band, and founder member of The Public Opinion Afro Orchestra, an Australian Afrobeats band

== Given name ==
- Ludowyk Smits (1635–1707), Dutch Golden Age painter

== See also ==
- Lodewijk
- Lodewyk
- Ludwig (given name)
