= Ľudovít =

Given name

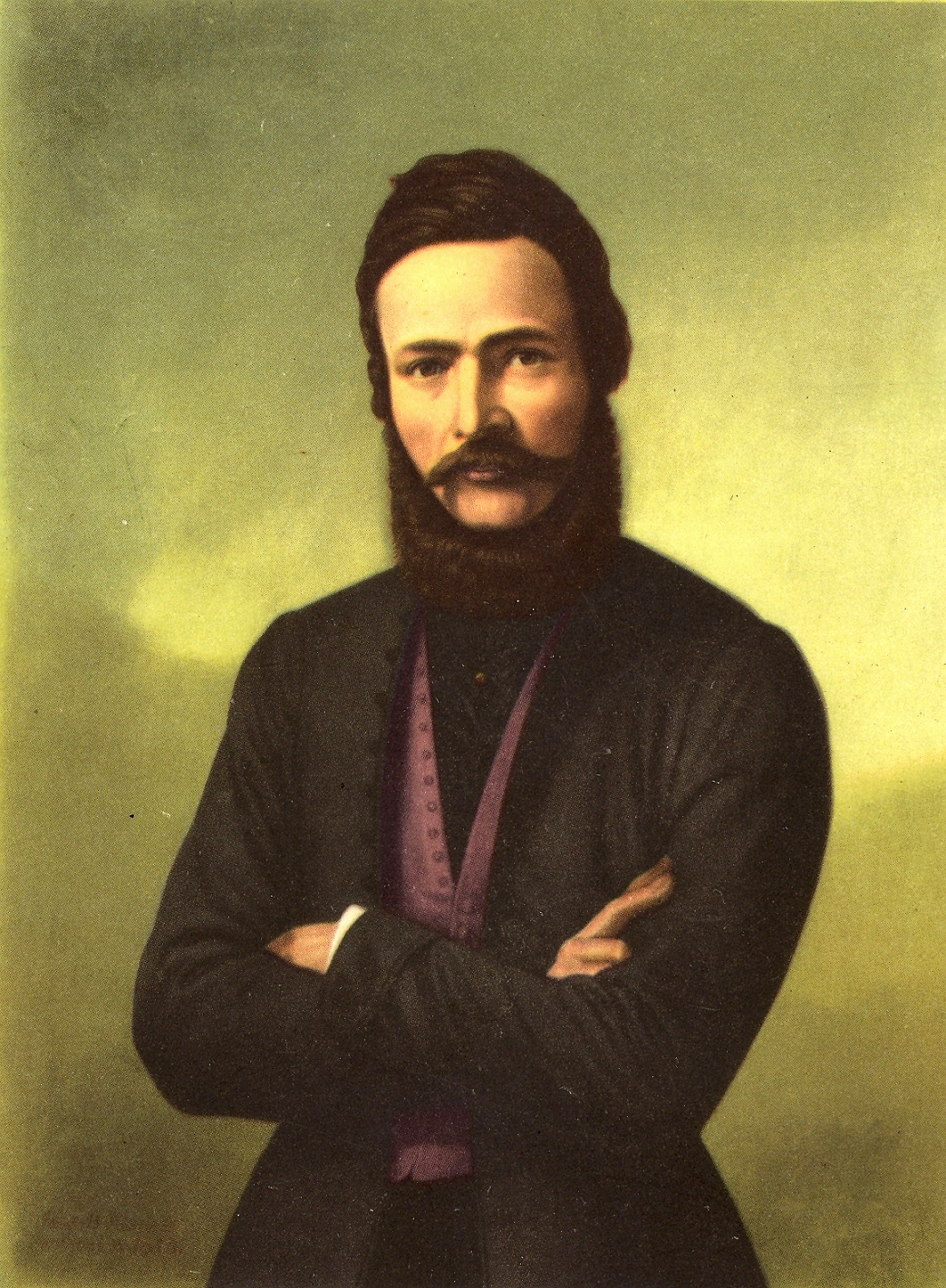
Portrait of Ľudovít Štúr by Jozef Božetech Klemens from the mid 19th century.

Ľudovít (Slovak: [ˈʎudɔviːt]; sometimes spelled Ludevít) is a given name. Notable people with the name include:

- Ľudovít Černák (born 1951), former Slovak politician, businessman, chairman of ŠK Slovan Bratislava
- Ľudovít Cvetler (born 1938), former Slovak football player
- Ľudovít Dubovský (1918–1998), footballer
- Ľudovít Fulla (1902–1980), Slovak painter, graphic artist, illustrator, stage designer, art teacher
- Ľudovít Goga (born 1969), Slovak politician
- Ludovit Greiner (1796–1882), forest and lumber industry management expert in the Austrian Empire
- Ľudovít Kaník (born 1965), Slovak politician and member of the Democratic Party of Slovakia
- Ľudovít Komadel (born 1927), Slovak former swimmer
- Ľudovít Kroner (1925–2000), Slovak actor
- Ľudovít Lačný (1926–2019), Slovak chess problem composer and judge
- Ľudovít Lancz (1964–2004), football player
- Ľudovít Lehen (1925–2014), painter and a FIDE Master for chess compositions
- Karol Ľudovít Libai (1814–1888), Slovak lithographer, draftsman and painter
- Ľudovít Plachetka (born 1971), Slovak boxer
- Ľudovít Potúček (born 1912), Slovak chess master
- Ľudovít Rado (1914–1992), Slovak footballer
- Ľudovít Rajter (1906–2000), Hungarian composer and conductor from Slovakia
- Ľudovít Štúr (1815–1856), Slovak revolutionary politician and writer
- Ľudovít Tkáč, former Czechoslovak slalom canoeist who competed in the 1980s
- Ľudovít Zlocha (born 1945), Slovak retired international football player

== See also ==
- Order of Ľudovít Štúr, Slovak state decoration
- Ľudovítová
- Ljudevit
