= Jack-a-Boy =

1901 short story by Willa Cather

- Short story by Willa Cather
- Country: United States
- Language: English
- Genre: Short story

Publication
- Published in: The Saturday Evening Post
- Publication type: Weekly magazine
- Publication date: March 1901

"Jack-a-Boy" is a short story by Willa Cather. It was first published in Saturday Evening Post in March 1901.

== Plot introduction ==
A young boy moves into a neighbourhood and makes friends with all the neighbours.

== Plot summary ==
A young boy, Jack-a-Boy, moved into Windsor Terrace with his family. He is loved by all the neighbours: the Professor, who lets him read books about Greek mythology; the old spinster, who gives him a makeshift toy dog; Miss Harris, with whom he would play the piano; the Woman Who Nobody Called On, whom he prefers to be a second-best mother. Once the boy throws a party and everyone helps him with the preparations. On another occasion he goes for a walk with Miss Harris and the Professor, who is allowed to hold his basket. Later, Miss Harris is summoned by the Professor to help him improve a makeshift map of the Peloponnesus with flowers.

The following Summer the boy gets ill. Miss Harris has forgotten to bring him cattails and acorns according to his wish. The Woman Nobody Called On holds him in her arms. The Professor answers questions about Greek mythology. Finally the boy passes away. Subsequent to his death, the Professor ponders that the boy had Ancient Greece in his soul. He then returns to his work on Greek prosody and Miss Harris to her piano lessons. On the first day of May, the Professor and Miss Harris join the Woman Nobody Called On in memory of Jack-a-boy

== Characters ==
- Jack-a-Boy. He lives in Number 324. He is 'a trifle girlish in his ways'.
- Miss Harris. The narrator. He is a piano teacher
- The Woman Nobody Called On. She lives in Number 328.
- The Professor. He studies Ancient Greek and Sanskrit.
- Miss Mellon. The old spinster in Number 326, her tenants and her maid.

== Allusions to other works ==
- Through the Professor, allusions made are to Homer, Georg Autenrieth's A Homeric Dictionary, Heinrich Ludolf Ahrens' Griechische Formenlehre, John Flaxman, The Trojan War, Harlequin, Friedrich Nietzsche, Artemis, John Keats, Rhesus of Thrace, Achilles, Patroclus, Aubrey Beardsley, Franz Schubert, Theseus, Centaur, Jack the Giant Killer, Golden Helen, Hector, Andromache.
- Miss Harris mentions Narcissus, paintings at the Borghese Gallery, Joseph Rodman Drake's poem The Culprit Fay, Santa Claus, Cupid, William Shakespeare's Hamlet ('the glowworm shows the matin to be near'), Pan, The Bible, especially Nicodemus and Mary Magdalene.

== Literary significance and criticism ==
The story is a reference to Willa Cather's youngest brother Jack, whom she 'nursed through a serious disease in the summer of 1893'.
