= Loïc =

- Gender: Male
- Language: French

Origin
- Origin: French
- Meaning: "Famed warrior" or "loot bringer"
- Region of origin: France, Belgium, Quebec and francophone Africa

Other names
- Related names: Louis, Clovis, Lewis, Ludovico, Luigi, Luis, Ludvig, Ludwig, Lodewijk, Lodewyk, Alois, Lowic
- See also: Lothar

Loïc or Loick is a male personal forename chiefly used in Brittany, in western France, and in the Breton community in French-speaking countries.

== Origins ==
Loïc is a Breton given name, based on Laou, a Breton diminutive of Gwilherm or Gwilhom (as Bill or Liam is to William), with the diminutive ending ig (like Billy). Bretons who do not speak Breton often think it is the Breton form of the name Louis.

In Provence, in southeastern France, many think that it actually is "the old Provençal form of Louis", in which case it means "famed warrior".

Another less well accepted derivation is from Loukas, a Greek name meaning "from Lucania" (whose usual French form is Luc (see Luke (name)).

== Notable people with the name ==
=== Loïc ===
- Loïc Amisse, French football manager
- Loïc Bigois, French Formula One aerodynamicist
- Loïc Bruni, French downhill mountain bike racer
- Loïc Cloutier, Canadian soccer player
- Loïc Costerg, French bobsledder
- Loïc Courteau, French tennis player
- Loïc De Kergret, French volleyball player
- Loïc Druon, French footballer
- Loïc Duval, French race car driver
- Loïc Fauteux-Goulet, Canadian contestant in Series 7 of The Great Canadian Baking Show
- Loïc Guillon, French football defender
- Loïc Jacquet, French rugby union player
- Loïc Jean-Albert, French parachutist
- Loïc Jouannigot, French children's book illustrator
- Loïc Le Meur, French blogger
- Loïc Leferme, French diver
- Loïc Lerouge (born 1977), French sprinter
- Loïc Loval, French football player
- Loïc Lumbilla Kandja, French football player
- Loïc Matile, French entomologist
- Loïc Meillard, Swiss alpine skier
- Loïc Merel, French mathematician
- Loïc Négo, Hungarian football player
- Loïc Nottet, Belgian singer
- Loïc Perizzolo, Swiss racing cyclist
- Loïc Perrin, French football player
- Loïc Rémy, French football player
- Loïc Vergnaud, French para-cyclist
- Loïc Wacquant, French sociologist

=== Loick/Loïck ===
- Loick Ayina, Congolese footballer
- Loick Essien, English singer
- Loïck Peyron, French yachtsman
- Loick Pires, Portuguese footballer
- Loick Landre, French footballer
- Loïck Lespinasse, French footballer
- Loïck Luypaert, Belgian field hockey player

=== Loïk ===
- Loïk Le Floch-Prigent, manager
