= Ludewig =

Ludewig is a surname. Notable people with the surname include:

- Dieterich Bernhard Ludewig (1707–1740), German organist
- Elsa Ludewig-Verdehr (born 1936), American clarinetist
- Frank A. Ludewig (1863–1940), Dutch architect
- Gottfried Ludewig (born 1982), German politician
- Heinz Ludewig (1889–1950), German footballer
- Johanna Ludewig (1891–1958), German politician
- Johannes Ludewig (born 1945), German businessman
- Jörg Ludewig (born 1975), German cyclist
- Uwe Ludewig (born 1967), German agricultural scientist

== See also ==
- Ludwig (disambiguation)
