= Ludvig =

- Gender: Male

Origin
- Origin: Scandinavian
- Meaning: "Famous warrior"
- Region of origin: Scandinavia

Other names
- Alternative spelling: Ludwig, Ludvik, Ludwik, Ludwick
- Nickname: Ludde
- Related names: Clovis, Lewis, Louis, Love, Lovisa, Lova, Ludvic, Ludvik, Ludovic, Ludovico, Luigi, Luis, and many more...

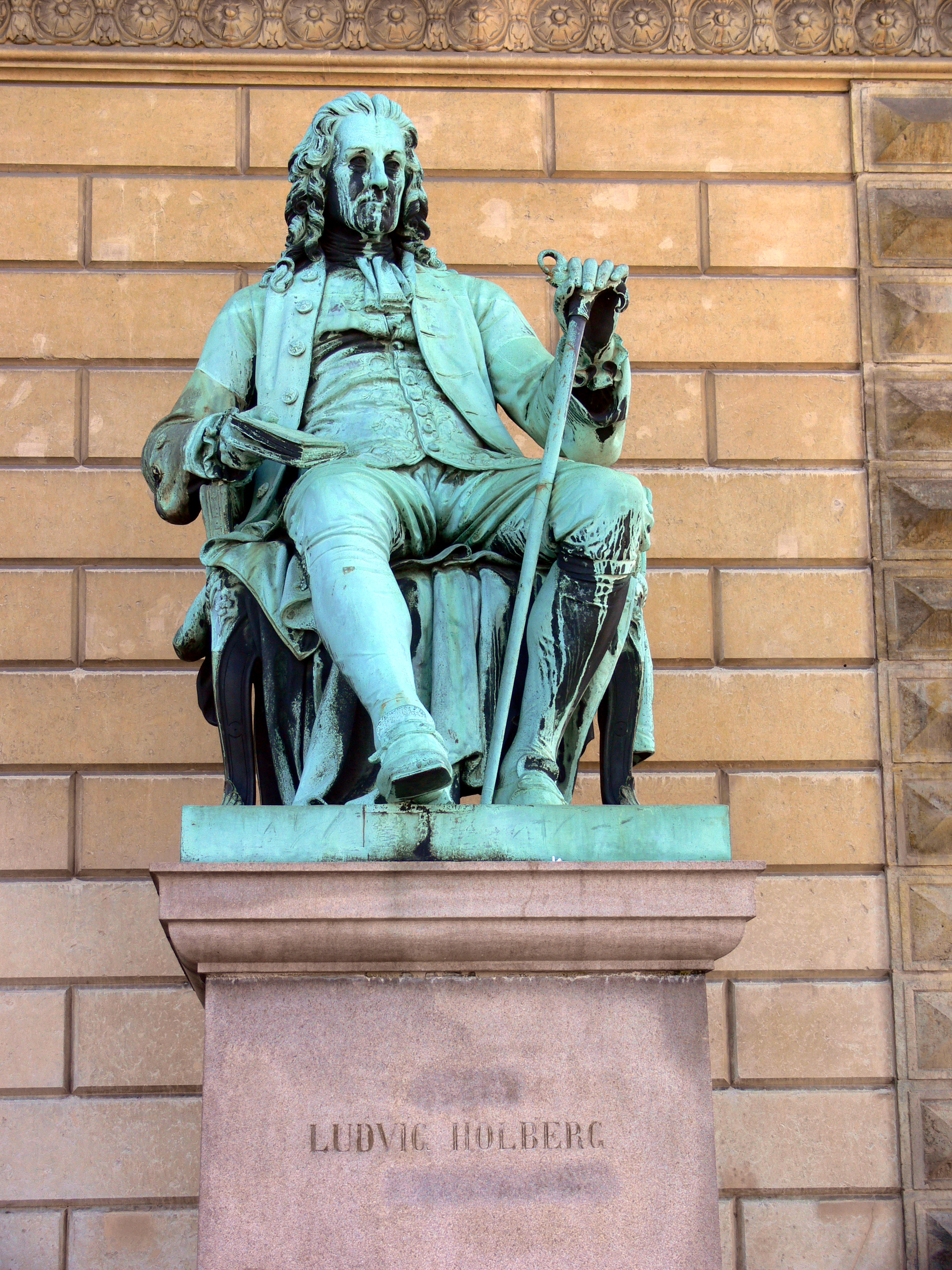
Statue of Ludvig Holberg (1684-1754)

Ludvig is a Scandinavian variant of the German name Ludwig. People with the name include:

- Ludvig Åberg, Swedish professional golfer
- Ludvig Almqvist, Swedish politician
- Ludvig Aubert, Norwegian Minister of Justice
- Ludvig Bødtcher, Danish lyric poet
- Ludvig G. Braathen, Norwegian shipping magnate and founder of the Braathens airline
- Ludvig Daae (disambiguation)
- Ludvig Engsund (born 1993), Swedish ice hockey goaltender
- Ludvig Faddeev, Russian theoretical physicist and mathematician
- Ludvig Gade, Director of Royal Danish Ballet 1877–1890
- Ludvig Hammarskiöld, Swedish officer and military historian
- Ludvig Hektoen, American pathologist
- Ludvig Holberg, Danish-Norwegian writer and playwright
- Ludvig Holstein-Holsteinborg, Danish politician
- Ludvig Holstein-Ledreborg, Danish politician
- Ludvig Jansson, Swedish ice hockey player
- Ludvig Mylius-Erichsen, Danish explorer
- Ludvig Nobel, Swedish engineer, businessman, and humanitarian
- Ludvig Schytte, Danish composer, pianist, and teacher
- Ludvig Strigeus, Swedish programmer
- Peter Ludvig Sylow, Norwegian mathematician
- Ludvig Sylow (DBU), Danish football executive
