= Liudvikas =

Liudvikas is a Lithuanian name, derived from the German Ludwig and thus a cognate of the English given name Louis. It may refer to:

- Liudvikas Jakavičius (1871–1941), writer, journalist, publisher, theatre director, banker and nobleman
- Liudvikas Narcizas Rasimavičius (born 1938), Lithuanian politician
- Liudvikas Sabutis (February 1939), Lithuanian politician
- Liudvikas Saulius Razma (born 1938), Lithuanian politician
- Liudvikas Simutis (1935–2014), Lithuanian politician
- Liudvikas Strolis (1905–1996), Lithuanian painter
