= Fruit (band) =

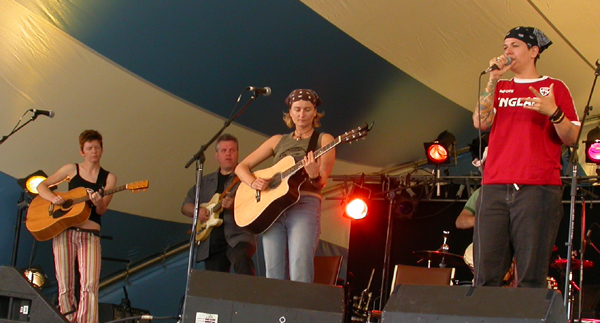
- Fruit performing at Thundering Women, June 2004, with special guest Wendell Ferguson

Background information
- Origin: Adelaide, Australia
- Years active: 1995–2006
- Label: Independent
- Past members: Susie Keynes; Sam Lohs; Mel Watson; Miranda Bradley; Jenna Bonavita; Catherine Oates; Anthony Scott; Yanya Boston; Brian Ruiz
- Website: fruitmusic.com.au

Fruit were an indie folk rock band from Adelaide, Australia. The group was formed in 1995, and consisted of Mel Watson (lead vocalist, horn player, songwriter), Susie Keynes (lead vocalist, guitarist, songwriter), Sam Lohs (lead vocalist, acoustic guitarist, songwriter), Yanya Boston (drums, percussion), and Brian Ruiz (Bass guitar). In 2003 they won the "Best Live Album" award at the Australian Live Music Awards. Their most recent album was Burn, which was released in June 2005.

== History ==
=== Formation and early years ===
Fruit was originally formed in 1995 by a chance meeting following a request for two groups of three to perform together at a local show in Adelaide:

Group 1: Jenna Bonavita, Mel Watson, Catherine Oates

Group 2: Miranda Bradley, Sam Lohs, Susie Keynes

The six members decided to rehearse together to do an encore performance at the end of their shows. It was later decided that they would combine their talents into one band, which became known as Fruit. All the members had known each other from various bands that they had been part of:

Emerald Sun: Mel Watson, Jenna Bonavita, Daniel Schultze, Yanya Boston

Breathe: Sam Lohs, Adam Budgen (future sound engineer for the band)

Fresh Air: Catherine Oates, Jenna Bonavita, Padma Newsome, Dylan Woolcock, Quentin Grant

Kai's Dilemma: Miranda Bradley, Susie Keynes, Clive Conway, Ashley Shepherd

Fruit's first studio release was the award-winning 1996 self-titled release "Fruit", which was then followed by the much acclaimed "Skin". Their first live album, Shift Live, was released in 1999, which contained songs from their first two albums, as well as previously unreleased songs.

=== Later years and hiatus ===
The band returned with their third studio record, Here For Days, in 2001. It was recorded with UK producer Paul Gomersall (who has worked with George Michael, Phil Collins, Echo & the Bunnymen, and Guns N' Roses), climbed to the No. 3 spot in the Australian Independent Charts. Their second live album, Live at the Basement, was released in 2002, and contained a number of new and old songs. The album won the Best Live Album award at the Australian Live Music Awards in 2003.

2005 saw the release of the album Burn. The album was produced by the Grammy®-nominated David Ivory, and was recorded in Philadelphia. Burn featured The Philadelphia Studio Strings orchestra conducted by arranger, Louis Anthony deLise. In late 2006 after a Fall tour of the North America the band went on an indefinite hiatus; Susie Keynes has been quoted as saying that Fruit is 'off the road for the time being'. The three head members of the band have ventures into new careers whilst dabbling in music. Susie is now Doctor Susie Keynes MD, Mel, the Director on an Aged Care Day Care Centre on Whidby Island off the coast of Seattle and Sam an accomplished home painter and part-time musician.

== List of awards and achievements ==
Australian Live Music Awards (ALMAs)

- Best Live Album in Australia
  - 2003 – Fruit "Live at the Basement"
  - 2002 – Fruit "Live at the Basement"
- Australian Tour Manager of Year
  - 2003 – Sue Arlidge
- Best Up and Coming Live Act in Australia
  - 2001 – Fruit
- Best Emerging Act in South Australia
  - 2001 – Fruit
- Best Live Act in Australia
  - 2001 – Fruit (Nomination)

Queen's Trust Award for Young Australians

- Mel Watson (for The into One Project)

South Australian Music Awards

- Most Outstanding Instrumentalist
  - 2003 – Mel Watson
  - 1998 – Mel Watson
  - 1997 – Mel Watson
  - 1996 – Mel Watson
  - 1995 – Mel Watson
- Most Outstanding Songwriter
  - 2003 – Mel Watson (Nomination)
  - 1997 – Sam Lohs (Nomination)
- Most Outstanding Vocalist
  - 2003 – Mel Watson (Nomination)
  - 1997 – Susie Keynes (Nomination)
- Most Outstanding Release
  - 1996 - "Fruit"
  - 1997 - "Skin" (Nomination)
- Most Outstanding Band
  - 1998 – Fruit
- Most Outstanding Group or Individual
  - 1996
  - 1997 (Nomination)
- Most Outstanding S.A. Release
  - 1998 – 'Shift' Live @ the Gov & JJJ, Fruit
- Achievement Award
  - 1998 – Fruit, for independent touring
  - 1997 – Mel Watson & Bev Luff for The into One Project
- Most Outstanding Live Engineer
  - 1998 – Adam Budgen
- Most Outstanding CD Artwork
  - 1998 – Miska Graphics, Rachel Harris & Andy Rasheed Photography for 'Shift'
- Most Outstanding Guitarist
  - 1998 – Anthony Scott
- Most Outstanding Bass Player
  - 1997 – Jenna Bonavita
  - 1998 – Anthony Scott
- Most Outstanding Drummer
  - 1998, 1997 – Catherine Oates
- Most Outstanding Video
  - 1997 – Mel Watson & Bev Luff for The into One Project

== Discography ==
=== Fruit albums ===
Fruit – selections from

1. "Mama Mama"
2. "Burn"
3. "Peace"
4. "Skin"
5. "Wait On"
6. "Wind Blows"

Burn (2005)

1. "A Thousand Days" (Lohs)
2. "Latitude" (Keynes)
3. "Jennifer says" (Watson)
4. "No regrets" (Watson)
5. "Almost lost my way" (Keynes)
6. "If only for the sun" (Lohs)
7. "if" (Watson)
8. "Burn" (Watson)
9. "Peace" (Keynes)
10. "Wait on" (Lohs)
11. "In between" (Watson)
12. "Weather girl" (Lohs)
13. "Cherish" (Susie Keynes tribute to Vicki Nottage)
14. "All this time" (Lohs)
15. "One fine day" (Keynes)

Fruit The Trio Album – Live at the Church (2003)

1. "If Only for the Sun" (Lohs)
2. "Alameda" (Watson)
3. "Intro Chat"
4. "Peace" (Keynes)
5. "Weather Girl" (Lohs)
6. "Intro to Narrow
7. "Narrow" (Watson)
8. "The Gift" (Keynes)
9. "Nothing But Blood" (Lohs)
10. "Thankyou Chat"
11. "Love You So" (Watson)
12. "Wind Blows" (Keynes)
13. "Alter Ego" (Lohs)
14. "Shift" (Keynes)
15. "Burn" (Watson)

Live at the Basement (2002)

1. "Wind Blows" (Keynes)
2. "All This Time" (Lohs)
3. "Alameda" (Watson)
4. "Nothing But Blood" (Lohs)
5. "Dreaming" (Keynes)
6. "Mamma Mamma" (Watson)
7. "Island" (Lohs)
8. "Human Condition" (Watson)
9. "Sunsets & Hurricanes" (Watson)
10. "Wild Angel" (Keynes)
11. "Skin" (Lohs)

Here For Days (2001)

1. "Sleeping in the Daytime"
2. "Wind Blows"
3. "Burnt and Crispy"
4. "Romantic Sentimentalist"
5. "Alameda"
6. "Wounded Child"
7. "Yeah Yeah"
8. "Cossip Queen"
9. "6 Thousand, 4 Hundred & 20 Something"
10. "Mamma Mamma"
11. "Wild Angel"
12. "New York Buildings"
13. "Tales And Truth"

U.S. Limited Release Fruit EP (2000)

1. "Company & Crowds"
2. "Nothing Higher"
3. "Shift"
4. "Gossip Queen"
5. "Island"

Shift, Recorded Live

1. "Magic (Live at JJJ)"
2. "Breathe Me"
3. "Alter Ego"
4. "This Life"
5. "Shift (Live at JJJ)"
6. "Nothing but Blood"
7. "The Gift"
8. "Six Thousand, Four Hundred and Twenty Something"
9. "Body Breakdown"
10. "Little Things"
11. "One Bite"
12. "Turning to Blue"
13. "Forever Young"
14. "Time to Go"

Skin (1997)

1. "Body Breakdown"
2. "Little Things"
3. "Game of Love"
4. "One Bite"
5. "Stay"
6. "The Gift"
7. "Skin"
8. "Guardian of Sin"
9. "Cool Desire"
10. "Perpetual Dreaming" (Bonavita)
11. "Time to Go"
12. "Body Breakdown (Remix)"

Fruit (Self-titled, 1996)

1. "Tin Can" (Lohs)
2. "Been There, Done That" (Bradley)
3. "Rings Around Me" (Keynes)
4. "Writing on the Wall" (Bradley)
5. "Luscious" (Lohs/Watson)
6. "Sugar Plum" (Watson)
7. "Dreaming" (Keynes)
8. "Turning To Blue" (Lohs)
9. "Forever Young" (Watson)
10. "Finally" (Watson)

=== Solo albums ===
==== Sam Lohs ====
How You See Me (2013)

1. "I Picture You"
2. "How You See Me"
3. "Company and Crowds"
4. "Across the Border"
5. "Truth It Is"
6. "Not Too Late for Change"
7. "In the City"
8. "To the Moon"
9. "This Bird"

We Trip Over Things (2006)

1. "Not a Lullabye"
2. "One Minute"
3. "Radiant"
4. "Skin on Bone"
5. "So Much More"
6. "We Trip Over Things"
7. "Salt"
8. "Weather Girl"
9. "Wait On"

Six Degrees (1998)

1. "Alter Ego"
2. "Violetta"
3. "Starfish Park"
4. "Tiffas Song"
5. "Rush"
6. "All The Lies"
7. "If Only for the Sun"
8. "No Violins"
9. "Brave"
10. "Six Degrees"
11. "Token"

==== Mel Watson ====
In Between (2003)

1. "Nineteen Seconds"
2. "In Between"
3. "Sailaway"
4. "Come On"
5. "Jennifer Says"
6. "Love You So"
7. "Observer"
8. "If"
9. "24 7"
10. "Lives for a Lie"
11. "Sunsets And Hurricanes"

Vox Humana (2001)

1. "Horn Addiction"
2. "Family"
3. "Illusion"
4. "Remedy"
5. "Magic – Slow Version"
6. "Where Will We Go"
7. "Space Machine"
8. "Organic"
9. "Narrow"
10. "Wired"
11. "Blind"
12. "Think of Me"

==== Susie Keynes ====
Kiss For Her Fears (2002)

1. "These Things"
2. "Sometime"
3. "Inside My Mind"
4. "Kiss For Her Tears"
5. "Bedroom"
6. "Washaway"
7. "Roses"
8. "Ridgeway"
9. "Common Ground"
10. "Round the Bend"
11. "Hilltops"

== List of notable tours ==
Fruit spent ten years solidly touring internationally throughout the United States, Canada, United Kingdom, Europe, South America, Asia and New Zealand.

2006

- FRUIT "Wait On" National Tour
- Fruit come out from the cold - North American Fall Tour
- 2006 Northern American Summer

2005

- Australian Summer Tour
- US - Canada Fall 2005
- Burn around Australia
- 2005 North American "BURN" Release Tour
- 2005 Australian "BURN" Release Tour
- 2005 North America Winter Tour

2004

- 2004 North America Tour
- 2004 Australia & Germany Release Tour

2003

- 2003 North America Summer Tour
- North American Fall Tour

2002

- 2002 North America Winter Tour
- North American Summer Tour
- North American Fall Tour

2001

- 2001 North America Winter Tour
- 2001 North America & UK Summer Tour
- 2001 Australia Tour

2000 and earlier

- 2000 International Tours - Edinburgh, North America
- 1999 International Tours - South America, North America, Germany, Edinburgh
- 1998 International Tours - Edinburgh, North America
- 1997 International Tours - Canada, Amsterdam

== Sponsors ==
Fruit's sponsors include Internode, Martin & Co (acoustic guitars) Sonor (drums)and PocketMail.
