= Loik =

Loik may refer to:

== People ==
=== Surnamed ===
- Ezio Loik (1919–1949), Italian soccer player
- Rein Loik (born 1950), Estonian politician
- Tõnu Loik (born 1875), Estonian politician

=== Given named ===
- Loïk, a Breton male given name
- Loïk Le Floch-Prigent (born 1943), French engineer

== Places ==
- Kufstein-Langkampfen Airport (ICAO airport code LOIK), Tirol, Austria

== See also ==
- Loic (disambiguation)
