= Loui =

Loui - male name:

- Loui Eriksson
- Loui Batley

and surname:

- Ronald Loui

== See also ==
- Louis (disambiguation)
- Louie (disambiguation)
