= Ljudevit =

Ljudevit (pronounced [ʎûdeʋit]) is a Croatian masculine given name. The name comes from the word ljudi, meaning people. The name Ljudevit is also used as a translation of foreign names such as Ludwig or Louis.

Ljudevit may refer to:

- Ljudevit (Lower Pannonia), a medieval duke from 810 to 823
- Andrija Ljudevit Adamić (1766–1828), Croatian merchant and politician
- Ljudevit Gaj (1809–1872), Croatian writer and politician
- Ljudevit Grgurić Grga (born 1951), Croatian TV personality, host of several Croatia in the Eurovision Song Contest events
- Ljudevit Jonke (1907–1979), Croatian linguist
- Ljudevit Jurak (1881–1945), Croatian pathologist
- Ljudevit Tomašić (1901–1945), Croatian politician
- Ljudevit Vukotinović (1813–1893), Croatian politician and writer
- Ljudevit Vuličević (1839–1916), Serbian writer

== See also ==
- Ľudovít
