= Ludwig (surname) =

Ludwig is a surname of German origin. It is derived from the Old High German given name Ludwig, which means "famous warrior". As a surname, Ludwig may refer to:

== People ==
- Albert Ludwig (1919–2019), Canadian politician
- Alexander Ludwig (born 1992), Canadian actor
- Alice Ludwig (1910–1973), German film editor
- Andy Ludwig (born 1964), American football coach
- Bob Ludwig (born 1945), American sound engineer
- Brandon Ludwig (born 1985), Canadian actor
- Carl Ludwig (1816–1895), German physiologist
- Cecilie Uttrup Ludwig (born 1995), Danish cyclist
- Christa Ludwig (1928–2021), German singer
- Christa Ludwig (writer) (born 1949) German writer
- Christian Gottlieb Ludwig (1709–1773), German botanist
- Craig Ludwig (born 1961), American ice hockey player
- Curtis Ludwig (1929–2012), American politician from Washington
- Daniela Ludwig (born 1975), German politician
- Daniel J. Ludwig (born 1990), American chess player
- Daniel K. Ludwig (1897–1992), American businessman
- David Ludwig (composer) (born 1974), American composer
- Duane Ludwig (born 1978), American mixed martial artist
- Edmund V. Ludwig (1928–2016), American judge
- Edward Ludwig (1899–1982), American film director
- Elmar Ludwig (born 1935), German photographer
- Emil Ludwig (1881–1948), Swiss writer
- Eugene Ludwig (born 1946), American banker
- Florian Ludwig (born 1970), German conductor
- Franz Ludwig (1876–1927), German actor
- Friedrich Ludwig (painter) (1895–1970), German painter
- Friedrich Ludwig (botanist) (1851–1918), German botanist
- Friedrich Ludwig (musicologist) (1872–1930), German historian, musicologist, and college instructor
- Geeske Ludwig (born 1967), Dutch cricketer
- Hanna Ludwig (1918–2014), contralto and mezzo-soprano, and academic voice teacher
- Hannah Ludwig (born 2000), German cyclist
- Jeanne Ludwig (1867–1898), French actress
- Jens Ludwig (born 1977), German musician
- Jens Ludwig (economist) (born 1968), American economist
- Joe Ludwig (born 1959), Australian politician
- Johanna Ludwig (1937–2013), German journalist
- Karen Ludwig (politician) (born 1964), Canadian politician
- Karen Ludwig (actress) (born 1942), American actress and director
- Ken Ludwig (born 1950), American playwright
- Klaus Ludwig (born 1949), German race driver
- Klaus Uwe Ludwig (1943–2019), German church musician, concert organist and composer
- Matt Ludwig (born 1996), American pole vaulter
- Max Ludwig (1896 –1957), German bobsledder
- Max Ludwig (general) (1871–1961), German general
- Michael Ludwig (born 1961), Austrian politician
- Mirko Ludwig (born 1961), German tenor
- Laura Ludwig (born 1986), German beach volleyball player
- Margaret Ludwig (1933–2017), American politician from Maine
- Martha L. Ludwig (1931–2006), American scientist
- Myrta Ludwig (1928–2003), Swiss chess master
- Olaf Ludwig (born 1960), German cyclist
- Otto Ludwig (writer) (1813–1865), German writer
- Rolf Ludwig (1925-199), German actor
- Salem Ludwig (1915–2007), American actor
- Saskia Ludwig (born 1968), German politician
- Spencer Ludwig (born 1990), American trumpeter
- Vera Ludwig (born 1978), German poet
- William Ludwig (screenwriter) (1912–1999), American writer
- Wilhelm Ludwig (1901–1959), German zoologist and geneticist

== See also ==
- Ludwig
- Ludwig (given name)
