= Lodwick =

Lodwick is a surname. Notable people with the surname include:

- Francis Lodwick (1619–1694), Dutch pioneer of a priori languages who lived in London
- Jake Lodwick (born 1981), American software engineer, serial entrepreneur and investor
- John Lodwick (1916–1959), British novelist
- Jonathon Lodwick (born 1989), English barrister and first-class cricketer
- Kathleen L. Lodwick (1944–2022), American educator, historian, biographer and author
- Lisa Lodwick (1988–2022), British archaeologist
- Seeley Lodwick (1920–2006), American politician
- Todd Lodwick (born 1976), American skier

== See also ==
- Charles Lodwik (1658–1723), Mayor of New York City from 1694 to 1695
- Lodwick Field, airport
- Ludwick, surname
