= Ludwig Breitenbach =

Ludwig Breitenbach (12 February 1813, Erfurt — 21 December 1885, Naumburg) was a German classical scholar specializing on Xenophon's writings.

He was son of a registrator Philipp Breitenbach. In 1828—1833 he studied at Pforta school in Naumburg. In 1833—1837 he studied at Halle university. Professor Gottfried Bernhardy had the largest influence on Breitenbach. He also helped the young scholar to choose the research field (Xenophon). Breitenbach's dissertatio inauguralis was about Xenophon's Oeconomicus (Halle, 1837).

In 1840 Breitenbach became Inspektor at Schleusingen gymnasium. Meanwhile, he completed an edition of Oeconomicus with apparatus criticus and Latin commentaries. In 1841 it made part of Friedrich Jacobs and Valentin Rost's Bibliotheca Graeca series (for which Raphael Kühner produced Anabasis and Memorabilia, and Friedrich August Bornemann — Cyropaedia). They asked Breitenbach to prepare editions of two more minor works of Xenophon (Hiero and Agesilaus, 1846–1847), which was followed by 2 volumes of Hellenica (1853–1863, the second not a part of Bibliotheca Graeca).

In 1842 Breitenbach moved to Wittenberg, where he continued teaching at gymnasium. He met his wife already in Schleusingen, with whom he lived for 12 years. They had four children. She died prematurely, then he became gravely ill: he had progressing deafness. He couldn't teach anymore and in 1860 he had to leave school. In 1864 he moved to Naumburg, where he spent his last years. He married subsequently another woman, who died prior to him too. He died at his home in Naumburg in 1885.

== Writings ==
Breitenbach's scholarly output may be divided into two periods. In the first he published editions of most of Xenophon's works: scholarly editions of Oeconomicus, Agesilaus, Hiero, Hellenica, and school editions of Memorabilia and Cyropaedia. To this can be added a school edition of Cornelius Nepos. In the second period, after his retirement, he was mostly occupied with new editions of the previous works. He also produced several new books: a school and a scholarly edition of Anabasis. His last work was a school edition of Hellenica.

While in the first period he was mostly occupied with textual criticism, in the second he was much more interested in real and historical commentary.

He was a great admirer of Goethe and published a book on his poetry.

== List of writings (selection) ==
=== Editions of classical authors ===
==== Scholarly editions ====
- Xenophon. Oeconomicus. In: Bibliotheca Graeca (Gotha: Hennings, 1841) digitized
- Xenophon. Agesilaus. In: Bibliotheca Graeca (Gotha: Hennings, 1846) digitized
- Xenophon. Hiero. In: Bibliotheca Graeca (Gotha: Hennings, 1847) digitized
- Xenophon. Hellenica. In: Bibliotheca Graeca
  - Libri I–II (Gotha: Hennings, 1853 digitized; Leipzig: Teubner, 1880^{2} digitized)
  - Libri III–VII (Leipzig: Teubner, 1863) digitized
- Xenophon. Anabasis (Halle: Waisenhaus, 1867) digitized

==== School editions (Schulausgaben) ====
- Cornelius Nepos (Halle: Waisenhaus, 1846 digitized, 1866^{2})
- Xenophon. Memorabilia (Berlin: Weidmann, 1854; 1857^{2} digitized; 1863^{3}; 1870^{4} digitized; 1878^{5} digitized; 1889^{6} besorgt von Rudolf Mücke digitized)
- Xenophon. Cyropaedia (Leipzig: Teubner)
  - Erstes Heft: Buch I–IV (1858; 1869^{2} digitized; 1875–1878^{3} digitized; 1890^{4} besorgt von Bernhard Büchsenschütz digitized)
  - Zweites Heft: Buch V–VIII (1858; 1869^{2} digitized; 1875–1878^{3} digitized)
- Xenophon. Anabasis. Nebst einem kritischen Anhang (Halle: Waisenhaus, 1865) digitized
  - Erste Hälfte: Buch I–IV
  - Zweite Hälfte: Buch V–VII
- Xenophon. Hellenica (Berlin: Weidmann)
  - Libri I–II (1873 digitized, 1884^{2} digitized)
  - Libri III–IV (1874) digitized
  - Libri V–VII (1876) digitized

=== Other ===
- Über die Entwicklung der Goetheschen Poesie bis zur italienischen Reise (Berlin: Weidmann, 1870)

== Sources ==
- Iwan von Müller. Ludwig Breitenbach // Biographisches Jahrbuch für Altertumskunde. 1886. S. 292–296.
- Sandys, John Edwin (1908). A History of Classical Scholarship. Vol. III. Cambridge: University Press. p. 160.
