= Louie (given name) =

- Pronunciation: /ˈluːi/
- Gender: Unisex, but usually male
- Language: English

Origin
- Origin: French, variant of Louis
- Meaning: Warrior, Knight
- Region of origin: United Kingdom

Other names
- Alternative spelling: Louis
- Variant forms: Louis, Luigi, Ludwig, Ludovic
- Nicknames: Lou, Louie, Lou Lou
- Related names: Louis, Lewis, Lois, Louise
- Popularity: see popular names

Louie has historically been regarded as a less common variant of the given name Louis. It originated in the United Kingdom (where Louis is pronounced /ˈluːi/) as a more regularly-spelled version without a silent ⟨s⟩. In 2011, it was the 74th most common forename for births in England and Wales, with Louis slightly more common at 68th. However in both 2022 and 2023 UK baby names popularity it has ranked above Louis. In the United States, Louis (there pronounced /ˈluːɪs/) is far more common.

The name is unisex; it is usually considered a masculine given name, as a derivation of Louis, but is occasionally given to girls as a diminutive of Louise.

== Variant forms ==
- English: Louis, Lewis, Lou, Lewes, Ludovic
- Arabic: Luay
- French: Louis, Ludovic
- Portuguese: Luís, Luiz
- German: Ludwig
- Italian: Luigi, Ludovico, Lodovico
- Polish: Ludwik
- Spanish: Luis
- Dutch: Lodewijk
- Catalan: Lluís
- Swedish: Ludvig

== Notable people ==
- Louie Anderson (1953–2022), American stand-up comedian, actor and television host
- Louie Bellson (1924–2009), Italian-American jazz drummer
- Louie Bennett (1870–1956), Irish suffragette, trade unionist, journalist and writer
- Louie Bickerton (1902–1998), Australian female tennis player
- Louie Conn, American dancer and NFL cheerleader
- Louie Dampier (born 1944), former American Basketball Association and National Basketball Association player
- Louie DeBrusk, Canadian former National Hockey League player
- Louie Espinoza (born 1962), American boxer
- Louie Giglio (born 1958), American pastor, public speaker, author and founder of the Passion Movement
- Louie Gohmert (born 1953), American politician
- Louie R. Guenthner, Jr. (1944–2012), American attorney and politician
- Louie Ignacio (born 1968), Filipino television director and painter
- Louie Kelcher (born 1953), American former National Football League player
- Louie E. Lewis (1893–1968), American politician
- Louie McCarthy-Scarsbrook (born 1986), English rugby league footballer
- Louie Nelson (born 1951), American former National Basketball Association player
- Louie B. Nunn (1924–2004), American politician, 52nd governor of Kentucky
- Louie O'Doherty (born 2000), English boxer
- Louie Ocampo (born 1960), Filipino composer and arranger
- Louie Ramirez (1938–1993), American boogaloo, salsa and latin jazz percussionist, vibraphonist, band leader and composer
- Louie Richardson (born 1985), Canadian Football League player
- Louie Simmons (1947–2022), American powerlifter and strength coach
- Louie Spence (born 1969), British dancer
- Louie Spicolli, (1971–1998), American professional wrestler
- Louie Myfanwy Thomas (1908–1968), Welsh author best known under the pseudonym Jane Ann Jones
- Louie Vito (born 1988), American professional snowboarder
- Louie Welch (1918–2008), American politician, mayor of Houston (1964-1973)

== Fictional characters ==
- Huey, Dewey, and Louie, Donald Duck's nephews in the Mickey Mouse universe
- King Louie, in the 1967 Disney animated film Disney's Jungle Book
- Papa Louie, a chef in the eponymous series of video games made by Flipline Studios
- Louie the Fly, antagonistic mascot of Australian insecticide brand Mortein
- Louie (The Pink Panther), the animated character in the 1993–1995 animated series The Pink Panther

== See also ==
- Louis (given name)
- Lewis (given name)
- Luigi (given name)
- Ludwig (given name)
- Ludovic (given name)
