= Lodewijk =

Lodewijk (pronounced [ˈloːdəʋɛik]) is the Dutch name for Louis. In specific it may refer to:

== Given name ==
=== Literature ===
- Lodewijk Hartog van Banda (1916–2006), Dutch comic strip writer
- Lodewijk Paul Aalbrecht Boon, (1912–1979) Flemish writer
- Lodewijk van Deyssel, (1864–1952) late 19th century Dutch literary critic and a leading member of the Tachtigers
- Lodewijk Elzevir (1540s–1617), 16th century printer and publisher of books and bibles
- Lodewijk de Koninck (1838–1924), Flemish writer

=== Music ===
- Edward Lodewijk Van Halen, (1955–2020) American guitarist
- Lodewijk Ferdinand Dieben (better known as Lou Bandy), Dutch singer and cabaret conferencier
- Lodewijk Fluttert (born 1991) Dutch DJ and producer
- Lodewijk Mortelmans (1868–1952), Belgian classical composer
- Lodewijk Parisius (1911–1963), Dutch/Surinamese tenor saxophonist

=== Sports ===
- Jan-Lodewijk de Vries, (born 1972) Dutch water polo player
- Lodewijk De Clerck (1936–2018), Belgian sprinter
- Lodewijk de Kruif (born 1969), Dutch football coach and former professional player
- Lodewijk Jacobs (born 1951), Dutch sprint canoer
- Lodewijk Prins, (1913–1959) Dutch chess grandmaster
- Lodewijk Roembiak (born 1969), retired Dutch footballer

=== Other fields ===
- Lodewijk Asscher (born 1974), Dutch politician
- Lodewijk Bruckman (1903–1995), Dutch magic realist painter
- Lodewijk Caspar Valckenaer (1715–1785), 16th century Dutch classical scholar
- Lodewijk De Raet (1870–1914), Flemish politician
- Lodewijk de Vadder (1605–1655), Flemish Baroque landscape painter, draughtsman, engraver, and tapestry designer
- Lodewijk De Witte (born 1954), governor of the Belgian province of Flemish Brabant
- Lodewijk Freidrich Paulus (born 1957), Indonesian politician
- Lodewijk Gerard Brocx (1819–1880), Dutch politician
- Lodewijk Heyligen (1304–1361), Flemish Benedictine monk and music theorist
- Lodewijk Makeblijde (1565–1630), Flemish Jesuit and a Renaissance poet and hymn writer
- Lodewijk Meyer (1629–1681), Dutch physician, classical scholar, translator, lexicographer, and playwright
- Lodewijk Napoleon, Dutch form of Louis I Napoleon Bonaparte, King of Holland
- Lodewijk Sigismund Vincent Gustaaf van Heyden (in Russian known as Login Geiden), Dutch admiral
- Lodewijk Thomson (1869–1914), Dutch military commander and politician
- Lodewijk Toeput (1550–1605), Flemish landscape painter and draftsman active in Italy
- Lodewijk van Bylandt (1718–1793), Dutch lieutenant-admiral
- Lodewijk van den Berg (1932–2022), Dutch-American chemical engineer
- Lodewijk van Gruuthuse (1427–1492), Flemish knight and nobleman
- Lodewijk van Schoor (1645–1702), Flemish painter, draughtsman and designer of tapestries
- Lodewijk van Velthem, a Flemish poet and priest
- Lodewijk Woltjer (1930–2019), astronomer, and the son of the astronomer Jan Woltjer

== Surname ==
- Martin Lodewijk (born 1939), Dutch comics writer and cartoonist

== See also ==
- Lodewyk
- Lode (name)
- Ludowyk
- Ludwig (given name)
- Ludvik
