= Ludwick =

Ludwick is a surname of German origin, and may refer to:

- Andrew K. Ludwick (born 1946), American businessman
- Christopher Ludwick (1720–1801), American baker
- Eric Ludwick (born 1971), American baseball player
- Ryan Ludwick (born 1978), American baseball player
- Sean Ludwick, American real estate developer convicted of vehicular homicide
- Tessa Ludwick (born 1988), American actress
- NDOKANG Ludwick (born 1987), Cameroonian Businessman and Pastor

== See also ==
- Lodwick, surname
- Ludvig, given name
- Ludwig (given name)
- Ludwik, given name
