= Carl Friedrich Nägelsbach =

German classical philologist

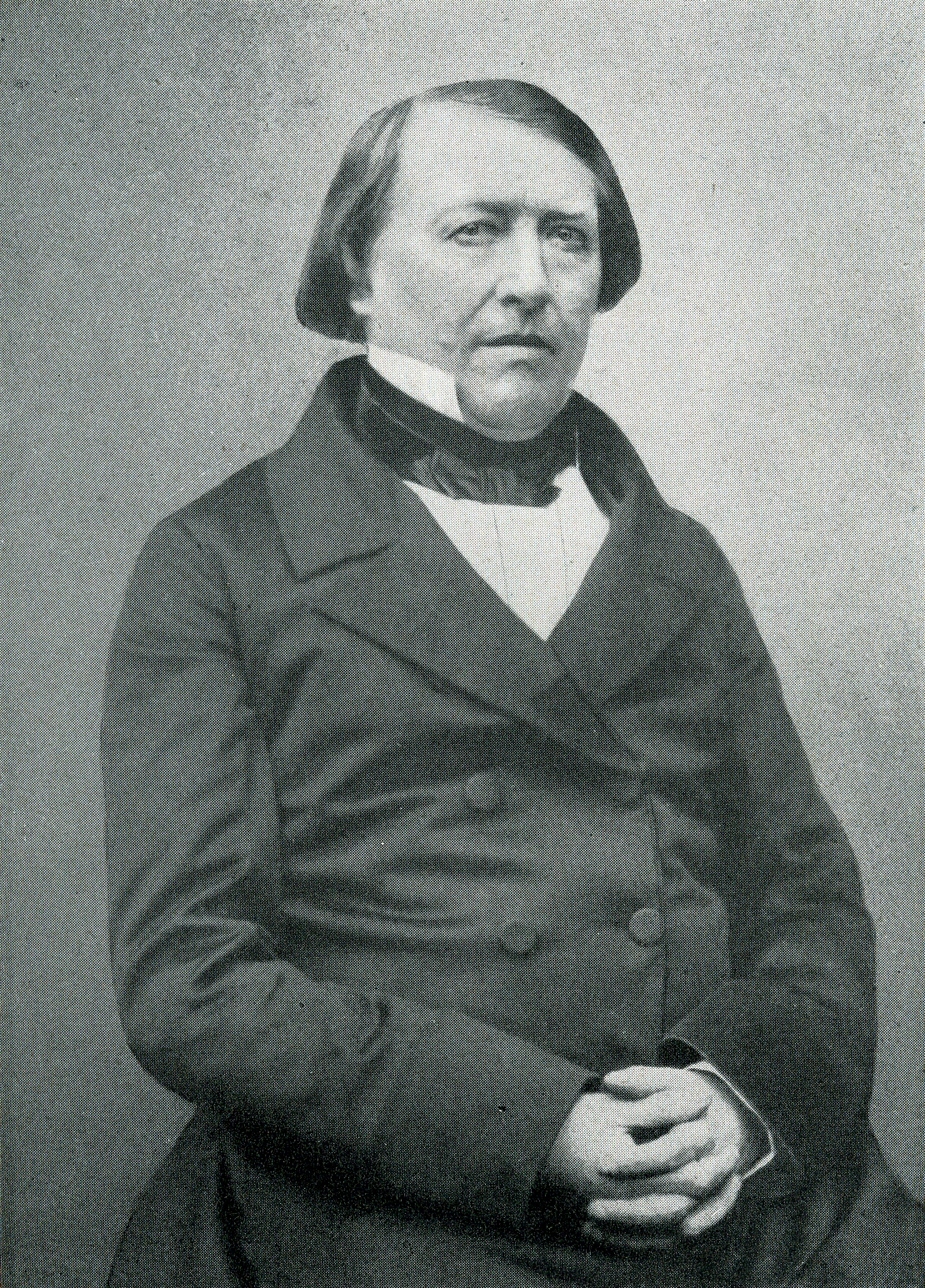
Carl Friedrich Nägelsbach.

Carl Friedrich Nägelsbach (28 March 1806 – 23 April 1859, Erlangen), was a German classical philologist.

Nagelsbach was born at Wöhrd near Nuremberg. After studying at the Universities of Erlangen and Berlin, in 1827 he accepted an appointment at the Nuremberg gymnasium. From 1842 up until his death in 1859, he was a professor of philology at the University of Erlangen.

Nagelsbach is chiefly known for his "Lateinische Stilistik" (1846; 9th edition by Ivan von Müller, 1905). Two other important works by him are "Die homerische Theologie in ihrem Zusammenhange" (1840; third edition by Georg Autenrieth, 1884) and "Die Nachhomerische Theologie des griechischen Volksglaubens bis auf Alexander" (1857).
