= Lodewyk =

Lodewyk is a Dutch and Afrikaans given name, equivalent to Louis or Lewis in English. While in modern Dutch the name is spelled Lodewijk, Afrikaans retains Lodewyk. Notable people with the name include:

- Lodewyk van Bercken (fl. 1456), Flemish jeweler and diamond cutter who invented the scaif
- Lodewyk de Deyster (1656–1711), Flemish artist and maker of musical instruments
- William Lodewyk Crowther (1817–1885), Australian politician, Premier of Tasmania 1878–79
- Edward Lodewyk Crowther (1843–1931), Australian politician, son of William
- Christian Lodewyk Stals (born 1935), South African businessperson
- François Philippus Lodewyk Steyn (born 1987), South African rugby player

== See also ==
- Lode (name)
- Lodewijk
- Ludowyk
- Ludwig (given name)
