= Louis Pope =

Louis M. Pope (born 1947) is an American businessman and has worked as a micro-credit and business organizer in Kenya.

== Biography ==
Pope was raised in Provo, Utah. He holds a bachelor's degree in mechanical engineering (1974) and an MBA (1975) from Brigham Young University.

In 1978 Pope formed US Synthetic, a company that manufactures diamond drill bits. Pope has a patent relating to this company's main product. The company was close to bankruptcy in 1985, but went on to become one of the fastest-growing companies in the US in the mid-90s. He was CEO from 1992, and it was bought by Dover Corporation in 2004. In January 2010, Pope retired from this position and moved close to Mombasa, Kenya to supervise his businesses there.

In Kenya, Pope founded Yehu Microfinance in 1999, which focuses on giving small loans to women. He also operates Coast Coconut Farms, a coconut oil business initiative largely involving local Kenyan women. He has also served on the board of Deseret International and Choice Humanitarian. Pope has also been a donor to BYU and Utah Valley University. He was named 2009 Utah Valley Entrepreneurial Forum's Ron King Social Entrepreneur of the Year.

Pope is a Latter-day Saint. He and his wife Christine have five children. His father, Bill J Pope, was a chemist at BYU, founder of Megadiamond and president of US Synthetic. His mother Margaret taught religion at BYU for 25 years.
