= Louie Louie (disambiguation) =

"Louie Louie" is an American rhythm and blues song written by Richard Berry in 1955 and best known for the 1963 hit version by The Kingsmen.

Louie Louie may refer to:

- Louie Louie (musician) (1962–2026), born Louis Cordero, Puerto Rican/American musician and record producer
- "Louie Louie", a song by the Pretenders on their album Pretenders II

== See also ==
- "Louie, Go Home" also known as "Louie, Louie Go Home", a song written by Paul Revere and Mark Lindsay as a sequel to "Louie Louie"
- "Brother Louie" (Hot Chocolate song), where lyrics mention frequently "Louie Louie"
- "Brother Louie" (Modern Talking song), where lyrics mention frequently "Louie Louie"
- "Louis Louis" (Kay One song), German adaptation of Modern Talking song with a new title
