= Liudvikas Sabutis =

Lithuanian politician (born 1939)

Liudvikas Sabutis (born 1 February 1939 in Klaipėda) is a Lithuanian politician. In 1990 he was among those who signed the Act of the Re-Establishment of the State of Lithuania.
