= Louis Schoonhoven =

Dutch entomologist

Louis Mensse Schoonhoven
- Born: June 30, 1931 (age 95); The Hague, Netherlands
- Education: University of Groningen (1957); Wageningen University & Research (PhD, 1962)
- Occupation: Professor
- Years active: 1972–1991
- Employer: Wageningen University & Research
- Known for: Insect-plant relationships
- Awards: Jan Wolkers Prijs (2015)
- Scientific career
- Fields: Entomology, Animal physiology

Louis Mensse Schoonhoven (born 30 June 1931) is a Dutch entomologist. He was a professor of general and comparative animal physiology and later entomology at Wageningen University and Research between 1972 and 1991. He is a specialist in insect-plant relationships.

== Early life ==
Schoonhoven was born on 30 June 1931 in The Hague. Although raised in an urban environment Schoonhoven became interested in biology at an early age. He started his secondary school at the gymnasium. During the Dutch famine of 1944–45 he moved to Groningen. Upon return to The Hague he switched his secondary school type to the Hogere Burgerschool. In 1950 he moved to Groningen to study biology at the University of Groningen. During this period he had internships under biologist Gerard Baerends and ecologist Luuk Tinbergen. Schoonhoven was trained as an animal ecologist and behavioural biologist. He obtained his degree in 1957.

He continued his studies at Wageningen University and Research in 1957. In 1962 he obtained his PhD under professor Jan de Wilde with a thesis titled: "Diapause and the physiology of hostparasite synchronization in Bupalus piniarius L. [Geometridae] and Eucarcelia rutilla Vill. [Tachinidae]". In his research he confirmed De Wilde's theory that the relationship between the moth Bupalus piniaria and the parasite Eucarcelia rutilla was based on hormones. Schoonhoven subsequently moved to the United States where he was a postdoctoral researcher under Vincent Dethier in Philadelphia. There he studied chemoreceptors in caterpillars. Back in the Netherlands De Wilde encouraged Schoonhoven to study insect-plant relations. Schoonhoven subsequently performed research on various caterpillars and the Colorado potato beetle.

== Career ==
In 1972 Schoonhoven became professor of general and comparative animal physiology at Wageningen University. After two years he was asked to become professor of insect-plant relations at the University of Oxford. He declined, fearing he would not fit in with the English university culture. From 1979 to 1980 he was editor-in-chief of the journal Vakblad voor biologen. Between 1982 and 1985 Schoonhoven was dean of the Faculty of Agronomy. In 1985 he became professor of entomology. He retired in 1991.

Schoonhoven considers himself a generalist within entomology. In 1998 he wrote the book Insect-Plant Biology together with Joop van Loon and Tibor Jermy. In the 2005 edition Marcel Dicke took the place of Jermy. The book inspired the general audience book Niet zonder elkaar - bloemen en insecten, which Schoonhoven wrote with several others. He has also written a biography of German naturalist Christian Konrad Sprengel.

Schoonhoven was elected a member of the Royal Netherlands Academy of Arts and Sciences in 1982. In 2015 he was the winner of the Jan Wolkers Prijs for the book Niet zonder elkaar - bloemen en insecten.
