= Ľudovít Lehen =

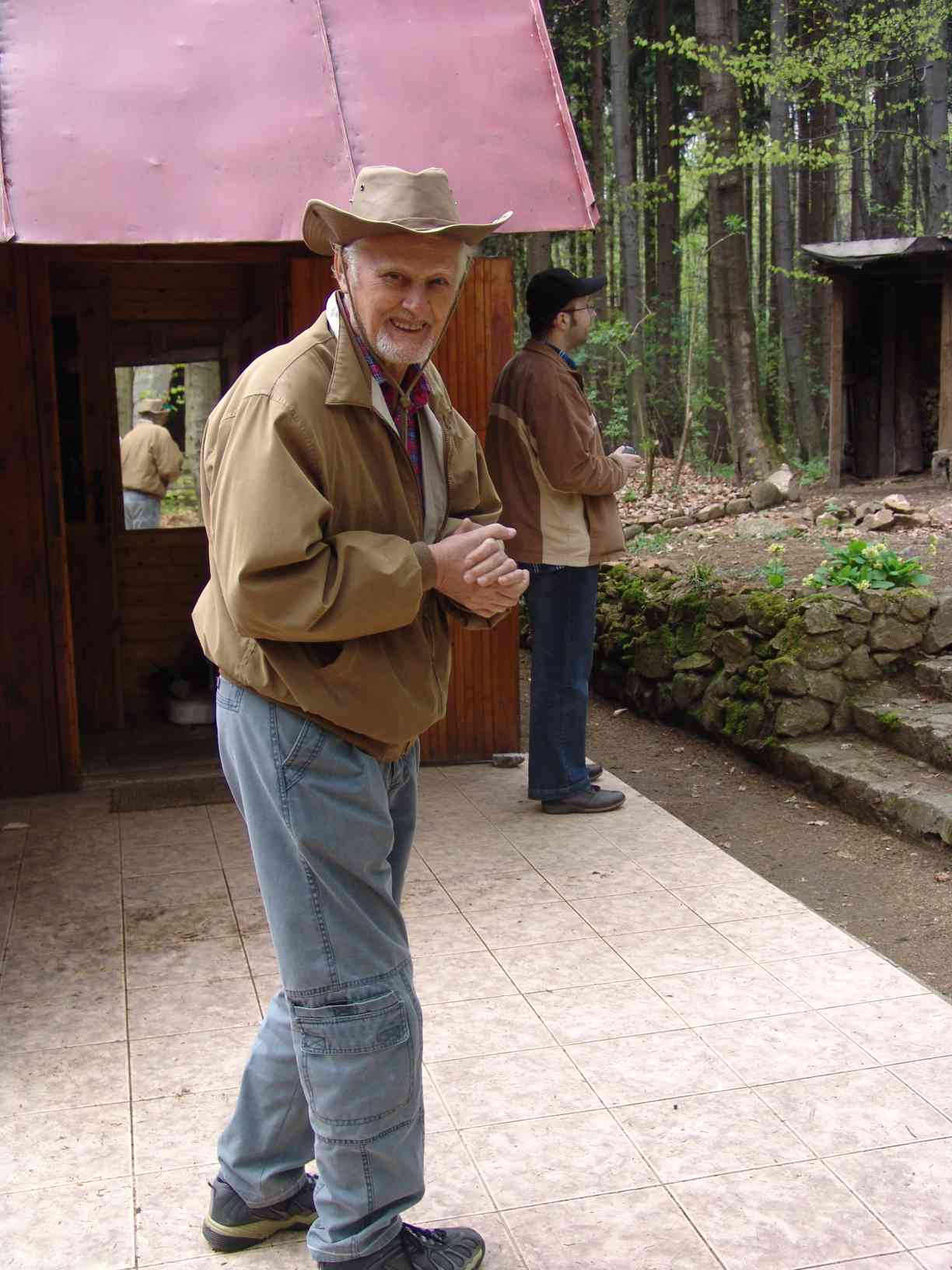
- Photo April 2008
- Born: Ľudovít Lehen; 3 June 1925; Banská Bystrica, Czechoslovakia, in present-day Slovakia
- Died: 12 May 2014 (aged 88); Bratislava, Slovakia
- Known for: Many and diverse fields of arts and chess composition
- Movement: cubism

Ľudovít Lehen (3 June 1925 – 12 May 2014) was a painter and a FIDE Master for chess compositions.

== Biography ==
Lehen studied at the University of Arts, Bratislava between 1949 and 1955 under the professors D. Milly, V. Hložník. In 1956 Lehen won first place in the Czechoslovak national competition for realist productions and a year later won second place in a graphics art competition,. Near the conclusion of the 1950s his works toured Belgium, China and the Soviet Union. Ultimately, he was charged in a show trial typical of communist Czechoslovakia, and from 1962 he spent 6 years behind bars at Leopoldov Prison. During the reforms of the Prague Spring of 1968 he was found innocent and released, and after his release Lehen started painting and become very solitary. Some of his works are now on permanent display at the Slovak National Gallery in Bratislava.

He composed chess problems since 1977. He has gained distinctions including the first prizes in many chess composition tourneys, often in coauthorship with IM Juraj Brabec. This composing duo pioneered many complex themes in fairy twomovers, working usually in a way Brabec proposing the scheme and Lehen developing it in the artistically satisfactory manner. In 2005 he became a FIDE master of chess compositions.

== Exhibitions in Slovakia ==
- 1967 – Leopoldov
- 1968 – Leopoldov
- 1973 – Trenčín – Art Protisy
- 1985 – Šaľa – Pastels
- 1998 – Galanta – Selection
- 2001 – ACTS - Bratislava
- 2003 – Bratislava Parliament

== Studio ==
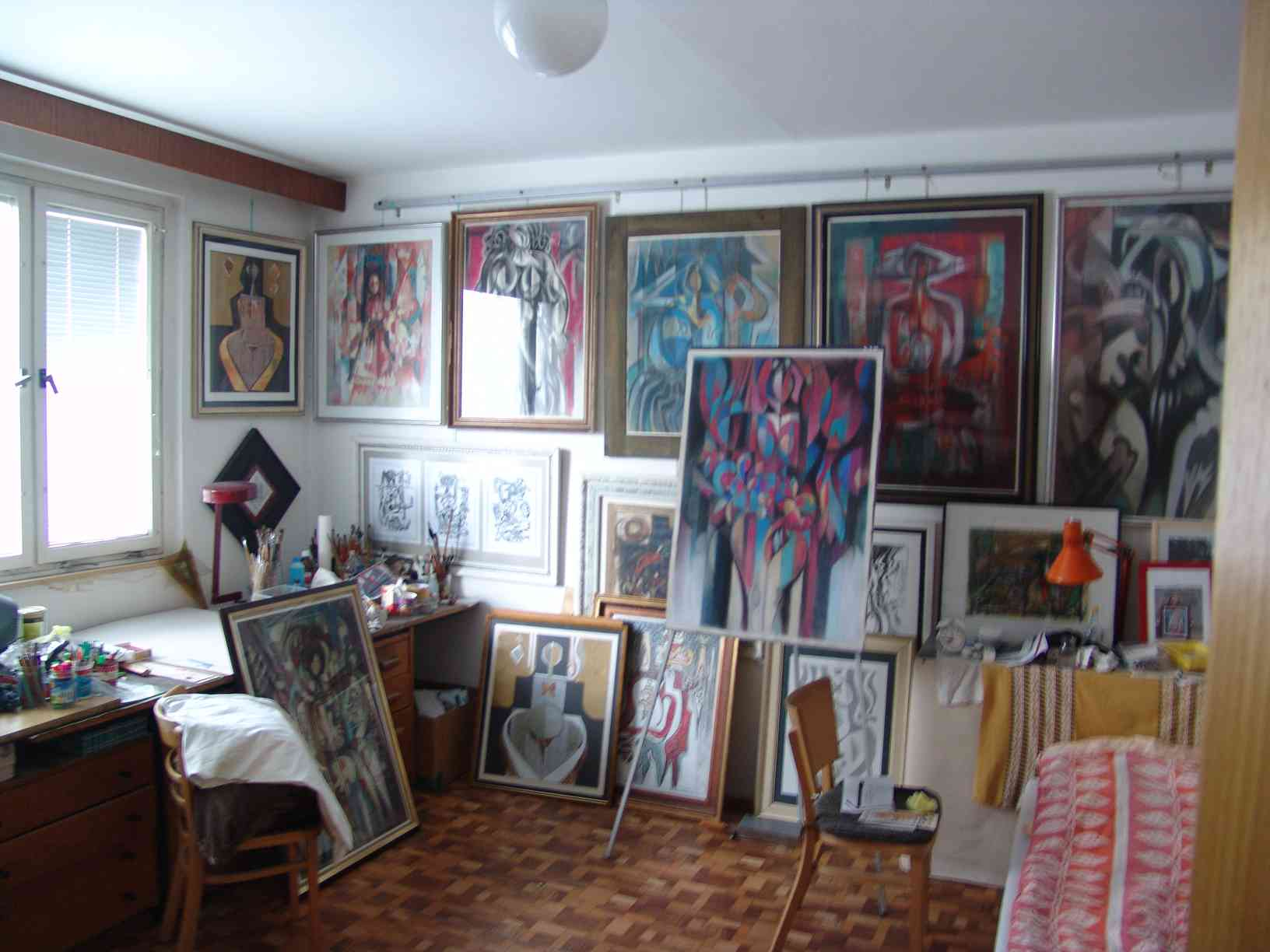
Ľudo Lehen's studio, 2008

Lehen lived in Petržalka in Bratislava. His flat was his studio and sometimes served as an exhibition room. His art centred on the female figure, sometimes as a daughter and sometimes as Venus or a girl in traditional clothing. The figures are stylized and included influences from non-European art.
