= Ivan von Müller =

German classical philologist (1830-1917)

- Born: 20 May 1830; Wunsiedel, Bavaria, Kingdom of Prussia, German Empire
- Died: 20 June 1917 (aged 87); Munich, Kingdom of Prussia, German Empire
- Education: University of Erlangen
- Occupation: Philologist

Ivan von Müller (20 May 1830 in Wunsiedel, Bavaria – 20 July 1917 in Munich) was a German classical philologist.

== Biography ==
He studied philology at the University of Erlangen as a pupil of Ludwig Döderlein and Carl Friedrich Nagelsbach. Following his graduation in 1853, he worked as a secondary schoolteacher in Ansbach, Zweibrücken and Erlangen. In 1864, he succeeded Döderlein as chair of classical philology and pedagogy at the University of Erlangen, where he also served as dean from 1870 to 1871 and from 1880 to 1881, and vice-rector from 1878 to 1879. In 1893, he succeeded Rudolf Schöll as professor of classical philology at the Ludwig-Maximilians-Universität München.

His published works are numerous. He was best known as general editor of the comprehensive "Handbuch der klassischen Altertumswissenschaft" ("Handbook of knowledge about classical antiquity"), and also for his critical editions of the works of Galen, and for his revision of Nagelsbach's "Lateinische Stilistik".
