= Ludwig V =

Ludwig V may refer to:

- Louis V of Bavaria (1315–1361)
- Louis V, Elector Palatine (1478–1544)
- Louis V of Hesse-Darmstadt, Landgrave of Hesse-Darmstadt from 1596 to 1626
