= Loich =

- Municipality
- Location within Austria
- Coordinates: 48°0′N 15°24′E
- Country: Austria
- State: Lower Austria
- District: Sankt Pölten-Land

Government
  - Mayor: Anton Grubner

Area
  - Total: 24.52 km^{2} (9.47 sq mi)
- Elevation: 449 m (1,473 ft)

Population (2018-01-01)
  - Total: 603
  - Density: 24.6/km^{2} (63.7/sq mi)
- Time zone: UTC+1 (CET)
  - Summer (DST): UTC+2 (CEST)
- Postal code: 3211
- Area code: 02722
- Website: www.tiscover.com/loich

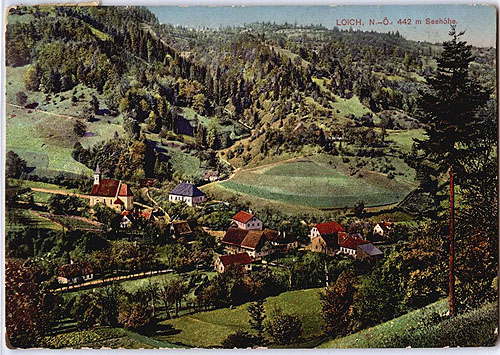
Loich (about 1910)

Loich is a small village in the district of Sankt Pölten-Land in the Austrian state of Lower Austria.

== Population ==
Historical population
Year	Pop.	±%
1971	656	—
1981	661	+0.8%
1991	653	−1.2%
2001	669	+2.5%
