= Louis Bannet =

Dutch trumpeter (1911–2002)

- Born: 15 August 1911; Rotterdam, Netherlands
- Died: 2002 (aged 90); Toronto, Ontario, Canada
- Genres: Jazz
- Instruments: Violin; trumpet
- Formerly of: Anton Swan and the Swantockers; Louis Bannet's Rhythm Five; Louis Bannet and His Adventurers

Louis Bannet (15 August 1911 – 2002) was a Dutch trumpeter popular during the 1920s and 1930s.

Following the German invasion of the Netherlands, he was arrested after being recognized by an SS officer on 15 December 1942 and taken to Auschwitz concentration camp. He played the trumpet in its orchestra for over two years and was taken to other camps before being liberated on 9 May 1945. He had an extensive musical career after his release, releasing 17 albums and hosting the television show Mon Coeur Est un Violinck (My Heart is a Violin) in Canada.

== Early life and musical education ==
Bannet was born Levi Bannet in the Hilton Hotel in Rotterdam at number 26 Katendrecht, on 15 August 1911. He was the youngest of eight children of Leon and Leenjte Bannet, though one of his sisters and two brothers died before he was born, and many of his siblings had left home by this time, leaving only him and his brother Isaac. Leon Bannet was largely unemployed tradesman and an alcoholic who could be abusive to his wife and children, whereas Leentje was a seamstress. The family relied on some money from Leentje's brother Abraham van Beuren who managed a Rotterdam blanket warehouse. Bannet grew up in a two-room apartment in Helmersstraat, the poor Jewish quarter of Rotterdam.

Bannet had his first encounter with music at age 6, hearing the son of a neighbor in the building frequently practicing his violin, and was given a violin by his father. He learnt how to play the violin by age 7, supported by his mother's savings held in a glass jar. As he practiced a Beethoven piece in the apartment, he was noticed by Leon Bloorman, a German violin teacher at the Jewish Conservatory of Music, from the street, and was asked to audition for the Conservatory's headmaster the next day. He succeeded and was admitted to the Conservatory on the condition that Bloorman would personally tutor him. His uncle Abraham van Beuren agreed to pay for his tuition. He formed a small orchestra with his fellow students in his second year, being hired out for weddings and bar mitzvahs and also playing on street corners. For Koninginnedag 1923, Bannet, then in his third year, played a selection of Beethoven music for Queen Wilhelmina when she visited the Conservatory.

== Musical career ==
At 13 years old, Bannet was seen as a violin prodigy. He began looking for work as a professional musician, attending coffee house and hiring hall Charlie Stock's to do so. There, he met Jewish pimp Hein Frank who gave him more adult clothes, and he was eventually able to get a job playing violin for a children's birthday party, and later in a cinema orchestra for silent films such as Laurel and Hardy films. He was later fired from the latter job due to his laughter distracting the other musicians, and was hired by Frank to do bookkeeping as he could not find more musical work. During this time, he heard Louis Armstrong's Hot Five and Hot Seven recordings, brought from America by sailors at Charlie Stock's.

=== Switch to trumpeting ===
Finding that there were too many violin players in the job market, he thus intended to switch from to a different instrument at age 14, and was given 30 guilders by his uncle to do so. Going to Mr Bommel's Music Store, he was unable to afford a saxophone, and so he instead bought and began playing the trumpet, finding teacher Aaron DeVries and frequently listening to Louis Armstrong's music, particularly the 1925 recording of St Louis Blues. In 1929, he landed a gig with novelty jazz band Anton Swan and the Swantockers, playing in dance halls and clubs in Amsterdam and The Hague. He formed Louis Bannet's Rhythm Five a few years later. The band played alongside visiting American musicians such as tenor saxophonist Coleman Hawkins.

Bannet formed Louis Bannet and His Adventurers and several other bands, becoming well-known through his performances and publicity photographs. He was particularly renowned for his performances of Armstrong's standards; at one show he played St Louis Blues five times after being cheered on to do so by the audience, and as a result was dubbed "The Dutch Louis Armstrong" by the press. He met Armstrong in 1934 at the last night of an engagement at the Lido in Amsterdam, and has stated that Armstrong said "So you're the Dutch Louis Armstrong. Well, it's nice to meet you; I'm the American one." The two jammed together and played "Between the Devil and the Deep Blue Sea."

Upon the German invasion of the Netherlands in May 1940, the Nazis barred Jews from nightclubs,concert halls and hotels, forcing the particularly well-known Bannet to quit. From June 1942, a friend who was part of the Dutch resistance hid him in a safe house in a small farming village. On 15 December 1942, however, he was spotted by a Gestapo agent who was also a fan of his while he was drinking tea in a bakery in Drimmelen. He was arrested at gunpoint and deported to Auschwitz-Birkenau, on a train alongside 635 members of the Dutch underground.

=== Time in Auschwitz-Birkenau and other camps ===
While waiting to be given his identification number, he was recognized by the Dutch interpreter for the Germans; Dutch pimp Hein Frank, a fellow inmate who had attended several of his shows, tattooed on him the number 93626 and recommended that he join the Men ‘s Orchestra of Birkenau, one of the camp's multiple bands. After an audition led by Ukrainian kapo Franz Kopka, in which two prisoners were led away after being unable to play the trombone and in which he has said Frank told him to "play for [his] life," Bannet succeeded in the audition by playing "St Louis Blues", making use of the room's stove to warm his fingers and lips, and was admitted into the orchestra.

Bannet played in the camp orchestra for over two years. He has said he largely played German marches such as "Alte Kameraden" as work at the camp began, and that he was sometimes made to play as the trains came into the camp "so people would think it wasn't such a bad place." He was once woken alongside a clarinet player and drummer by an SS officer and taken to a house in the countryside to play music for a party held by Josef Mengele, playing songs such as "Tiger Rag" and "Ain't Misbehavin'" while hidden behind plants so they were not seen. Bannet's mother, brother, two sisters and their children were part of the 41 members of Bannet's family who were killed in the camps. He was able to save the life of his brother, who was unable to work at the camp, by hiding him in a cart of refuse that the band moved each day and smuggling medicine to him.

In November 1944, Bannet was marched from Auschwitz to Ohrdruf concentration camp, taking his trumpet with him on his waist. He was forced to do manual labor as there was no orchestra at Ohrdruf, until a friend introduced him to an SS officer who gave him another audition on a violin with two strings. He played "My Home Is a Star", and again succeeded when the officer asked him to play it for his wife over the telephone. He was then sent to concentration camps Sachsenhausen and then Buchenwald before being moved onto a train with 103 people for over a month, subject to the threat of typhus yet being one of only 17 people to survive this train.

=== Liberation and life after the war ===
On 9 May 1945, he was liberated from Auschwitz and sent to a camp for displaced persons in Bamberg, Germany. He stayed at the camp for a year to entertain thousands of the refugees there. While at a friend's house after returning home, he met and soon married Floorjte Sarsaty, whose husband had died in Auschwitz. They had a son, Louis Bannet Jr. He formed another band, playing in Belgium, Switzerland and France, before leaving the Netherlands for Montreal, Canada in 1956.

In 1962, Bannet became the host of Mon Coeur Est un Violinck (My Heart is a Violin), a popular television show, and released 17 albums.

In 2001, Bannet was living in Toronto. He died there from cancer in 2002, at the age of 90. His trumpet was exhibited in the Museum of Jewish Heritage by that year, and the trumpet remains there as of 2021.
