= Georg Autenrieth =

German philologist (1833–1900)

Georg Autenrieth (3 November 1833, in Schwand – 8 June 1900, in Nuremberg) was a German philologist and educator.

From 1852, he studied philosophy, philology and theology at the University of Erlangen, and after completion of studies, taught classes on different subjects at the gymnasium in Erlangen (1857–1872). In 1869, he received the title of professor. Later, he served as rector at gymnasiums in Zweibrücken (1872–84) and Nuremberg (Melanchthon-Gymnasium; 1884–1900).

== Published works ==
He was the author of a popular Homeric dictionary, Wörterbuch zu den Homerischen Gedichten (1873, 9th edition 1902), that was translated into English and published as A Homeric dictionary, for schools and colleges (1880). His other noteworthy written efforts include:

- Bayerische Fürstentafel, zunächst für den Schulgebrauch entworfen, 1864 – Bavarian Fürstentafel.
- Grundzüge der Moduslehre im Griechischen und Lateinischen, 1878 – General teaching mode of Greek and Latin.
- Das Sebaldusgrab Peter Vischers, historisch und künstlerisch betrachtet, 1887 – The grave of Sebaldus by sculptor Peter Vischer, historical and artistic considerations.
- Entwickelung der Relativsätze im Indogermanischen, 1893 – Development of relative clauses in Indo-European.
- Pfälzisches Idiotikon. Ein Versuch, 1899 – Palatinate idioticon, an essay.

After the death of philologist Carl Friedrich Nagelsbach, Autenrieth released new editions of his works on Homeric theology, gymnasium pedagogy, comments on the Iliad and Latin stylistics for Germans. He also published a biography of Nagelsbach in the Allgemeine Deutsche Biographie.
