= Louis d'Orléans =

Louis d'Orléans or Louis of Orléans may refer to:

- Louis I, Duke of Orléans (1372–1407), younger brother of Charles VI of France
- Louis of Valois (1549–1550), son of Henry II of France
- King Louis XII (1462–1515), Duke of Orléans between 1465 and 1498
- Louis I d'Orléans, duc de Longueville (1480–1516), son of François I, Duke of Longueville
- Louis II d'Orléans, Duke of Longueville (1510–1537)
- Louis, Duke of Orléans (born 1703) (1703–1752), grandfather of Philippe Égalité
- Prince Louis, Duke of Nemours (1814–1896), son of Louis Philippe I and great-great-grandson of the above
- Louis d'Orléans, Prince of Condé (1845–1866), son of Henri d'Orleans, Duke of Aumale

== See also ==
- House of Orléans
- Duke of Orléans
- Louis Dorléans (1542–1629), poet and political pamphleteer
