= Lois (disambiguation) =

Lois is a given name (the article includes a list of people and fictional characters withy the name).

Lois may also refer to:

== People known by the mononym ==
- Lois (biblical figure)
- Lois Maffeo, known for much of her career as Lois, American musician

== Other uses ==
- Lois, a synonym of Orodesma, a genus of moths
- Lois, Missouri, a place in the United States
