= Ozwords =

Australian newspaper

Issues of June 1998, October 2014

Ozwords was a publication of the Australian National Dictionary Centre, a joint project of Oxford University Press and the Australian National University.

== History ==
Ozwords began in 1989 as a simple typescript Australian National Dictionary Centre Newsletter with limited circulation. Its scope and production values increased with the number of subscribers until it was re-booted as Ozwords Volume 1, Issue 1, of January 1994. From October 1999 until 2019, it was published twice a year in April and October.

Frederick Ludowyk (1 September 1934 – 15 May 2012), writer and playwright, edited the journal for some years.

After 2012, it was also published online as a blog. Its last issue was Volume 28, Number 2 of October 2019, at which time it was being published twice a year.

== Content ==
The newsletter reported on activities of the centre, such as the retirement in 1994 of the director, Bill Ramson and the appointment of his successor, Bruce Moore, and some advertising material, but also included essay-length articles on some aspect of Australian vernacular, letters to the editor, and a twice-yearly competition, the prize being a $100 discount on any OUP publication.

Subscription was free of charge, on receipt of a written or faxed request.
