= Ludvig Daae =

Ludvig Daae may refer to:

- Ludvig Daae (priest) (1723–1786), Norwegian priest and landowner
- Ludvig Kristensen Daa (1809–1877), Norwegian historian and politician
- Ludvig Daae (politician) (1829–1893), Norwegian politician
- Ludvig Ludvigsen Daae (1834–1910), Norwegian historian
- "Ludvig Daae", a song by Norwegian snowboarder Helene Olafsen from the TV series Norges nye megahit, named after the real owner of a slalom center
