= Karl Ludwig Libay =

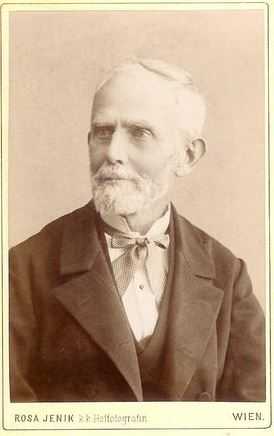
Karl Ludwig Libay (1885/87)

Karl Ludwig Libay (Hungarian: Libay Károly Lajos, Slovak: Karol Ľudovít Libai; 13 May 1814/1816 – 16 January 1888) was a Hungarian lithographer, draftsman and painter.

== Biography ==
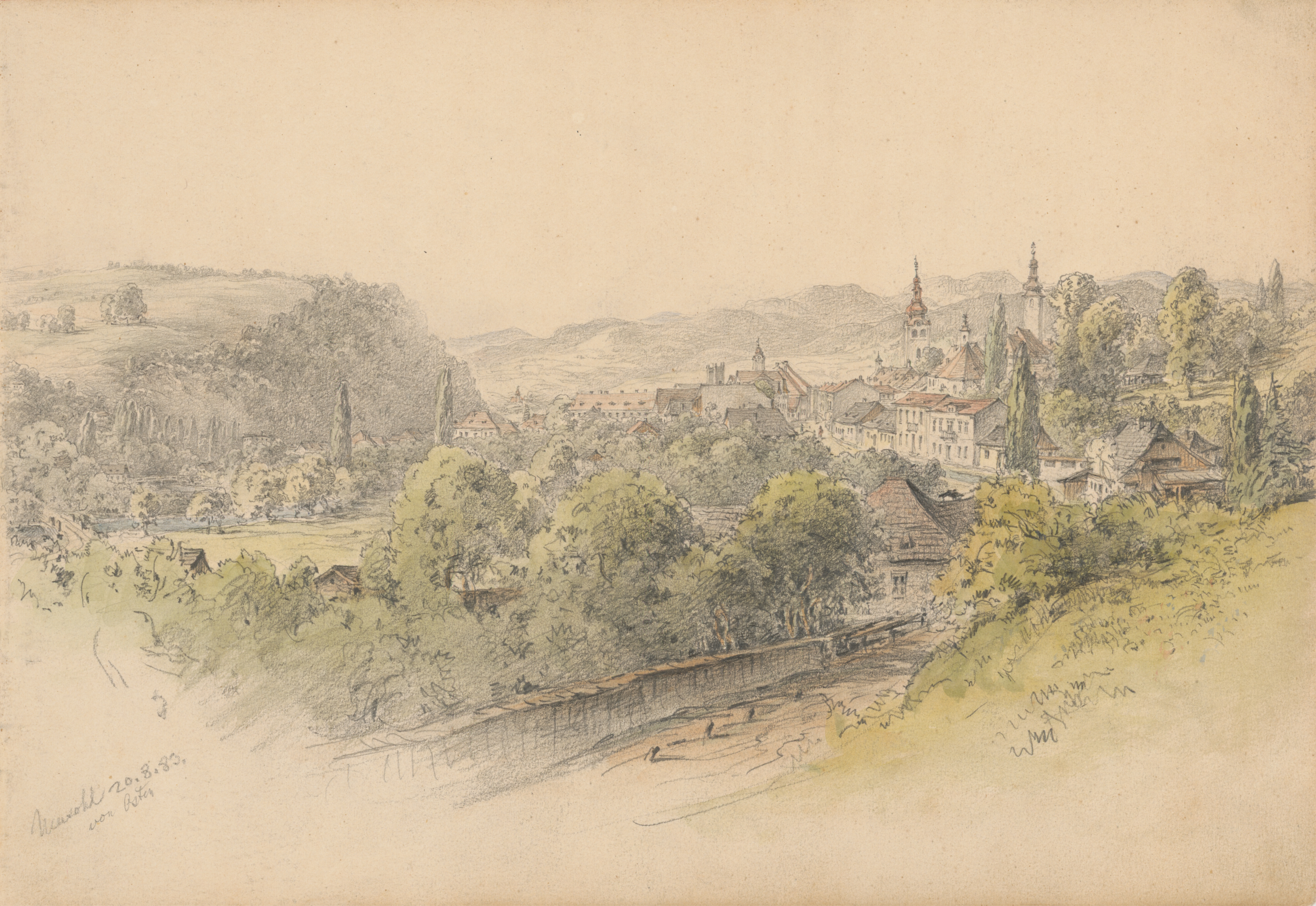
View of Banská Bystrica from the East

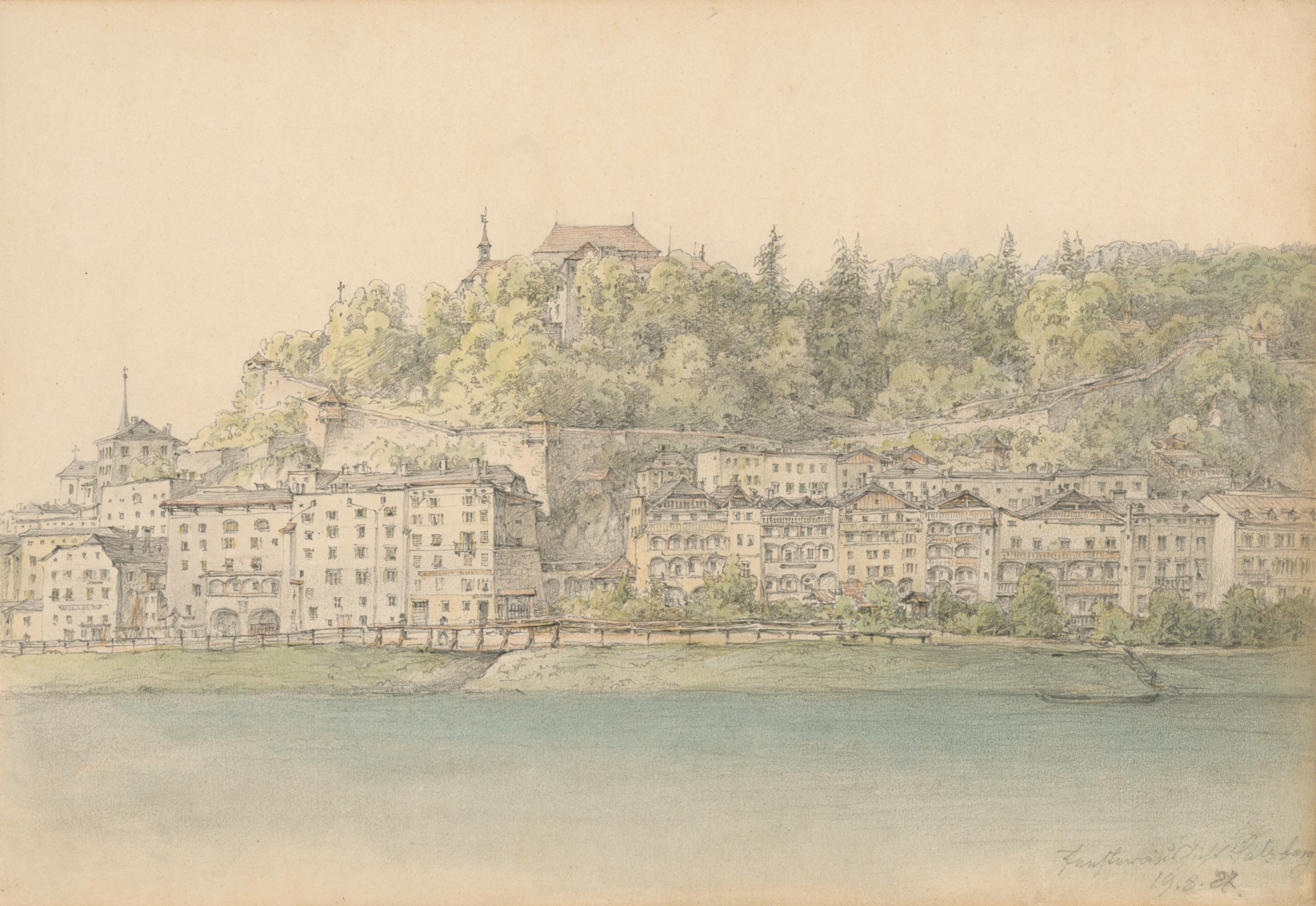
Salzburg

Libay was born on 13 May 1814 or 1816 in Besztercebánya, Kingdom of Hungary (now Banská Bystrica, Slovakia). His father, Sámuel Libay, was a silversmith and goldsmith. He began with the intention of becoming a goldsmith as well; serving an apprenticeship with his father from 1892 to 1832. That year, the Goldsmith's Guild promoted him to Journeyman. Two years later, aged only twenty, he achieved the status of Master. Shortly after, he went to Vienna to sharpen his skills, but his exposure to the cosmopolitanism there diverted his attention to a different kind of artistic endeavor.

In 1835, he enrolled at the Academy of Fine Arts. His teachers there included the portraitist, Karl Gsellhofer, Johann Nepomuk Ender, Leopold Kupelwieser (a friend of Franz Schubert), and the landscape painter, Joseph Mössmer. His first paintings were mostly landscapes and vedute. After 1845, he was able to continue his studies with the assistance of a patron; Count August Breuner-Enckevoirt.

He loved to travel and created several lithographic albums of his travels throughout Europe. His first exhibition came in 1840, with views of Budapest. In 1848, he published a book with views of Bad Ischl and, the following year, one of Salzburg with scenes of the Salzkammergut region. From 1849 to 1850, he travelled from Bavaria to Southern Italy; painting views for Archduke John of Austria. A trip to Egypt from 1855 to 1856 resulted in an album of 45 color lithographs, for which he received an award from Alexander von Humboldt in 1857. A planned trip to the Americas was never realized, due to Von Humboldt's death.

The first lithographs of his hometown appeared in 1852, when he made a lengthy return visit. Five years later, he returned again and focused on drawing castles; notably at Árva and Zólyom. During his visit in 1883, he also made sketches in Szklenófürdő and Csorbató. His last visits came in 1884 and 1886, when he made sketches on Urpín Mountain. His last drawings were made in Salzburg, in 1887.

On Christmas Eve, he always gave clothing and shoes to poor children. He died in Vienna on 16 January 1888. He left a ten-page will, which included a large donation to the Evangelical Elementary School in Besztercebánya. Single and childless, he was given a modest funeral and, per his wishes, his heart was pierced.

His original works may be seen at the Slovak National Gallery, the Stredoslovenské múzeum, the East Slovak Museum, the Albertina and the Hungarian National Gallery.
