= Johanna Ludewig =

German politician (1891–1958)

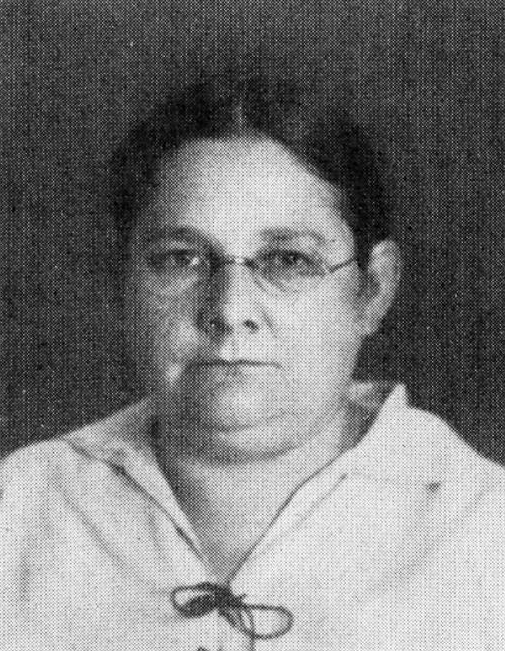
Ludewig c. 1932

Johanna Ludewig (28 March 1891 – 11 July 1958) was a German politician (SPD, KPD). As a member of the Prussian parliament between 1921 and 1933 she was particularly active in the Communist Women's movement. During 1944 she survived approximately three weeks as an internee in the Ravensbrück concentration camp.

== Life ==
Johanna Ludewig was born in Berlin. Her father was a plumber. She attended a school with a commercial focus and worked between 1907 and 1928 in various functions in the accounts and purchasing departments with a succession of Berlin companies.

She joined the Social Democratic Party (SPD) in 1912. She was a section leader for the party in the "Berlin I" electoral district and a member of the new left wing National Executive. What amounted to a political truce agreed in 1914 by the party leadership for the duration of the First World War had set up internal party tensions which only became more acute as front line slaughter and austerity at home intensified. In 1916 the party split apart and Johanna Ludewig became a member and official of the breakaway Independent Social Democratic Party (Unabhängige Sozialdemokratische Partei Deutschlands, USPD). At the end of 1920, when the USPD itself split, she was with the left-wing majority that joined the newly formed Communist Party of Germany.

By that time she had already been a member of the Berlin city council since March 1919 – at that time as a USPD member. With the boundary changes of June 1920 that gave rise to the Greater Berlin administrative district she continued, without a break, to sit as a member of the enlarged city district, now as a Communist.

In 1921 she was elected to the Prussian Parliament (Landtag) where she would sit as a Communist member till 1933. Even in 1928 she would be one of just two female Communist members in the chamber: there were fifty-four male communists in that session. During her time in the Landtag she was engaged, above all, in the Communist women's movement. In 1927 she was secretary of the Red Women's and Girls' Association (RFMB). As political extremism grew in Germany, in 1932 she became the leader of the "Women's and Girls' Board" (Frauen- und Mädchenstaffel) of the Fighters against Fascism (Kampfbund gegen den Faschismus).

The populist tide nevertheless proved unstoppable: in January 1933 the Nazi Party took power and lost no time in transforming Germany into an unconstrained one-party dictatorship. Directly following the Reichstag fire at the end of February 1933, Chancellor Hitler's government blamed "communists" and launched a major round-up of those who had been active Communist politicians before the regime change. Johanna Ludewig fled, initially to Britain and then to Denmark. However, she returned to Germany in 1934 and took a job as a book keeper in Berlin. She was kept under police surveillance and on several occasions interviewed by the Gestapo. According to one source she was arrested in 1937, but there is no indication of any lengthy period of detention at this point. However, in 1944 the unsuccessful assassination attempt against Hitler opened the way for a massive further round-up of people still in Germany who had been politically active as communists or socialists before 1933. Johanna Ludewig was arrested, like several thousand others, towards the end of August 1944 in connection with what came to be known as Aktion Gitter. She was taken to the Ravensbrück concentration camp. Approximately three weeks later, on 12 September 1944 she was released, but after this she spent several more weeks in police jails in Berlin.

War ended, formally in May 1945, and she returned to her job. She was no longer engaged in public politics. Johanna Ludewig died on 11 July 1958 in West Berlin.
