= Luis (disambiguation) =

Luis is a male given name. It can also refer to:

- Luis (letter), the second letter of the Ogham alphabet
- Luis (TV series), a short-lived television sitcom starring Luis Guzmán
- Luis Muñoz Marín International Airport, main airport in San Juan, Puerto Rico
- Hurricane Luis, one of the deadliest and most destructive hurricanes of the 1995 Atlantic hurricane season
- Luis (footballer) (1946–2024), Luis García Mosquera, Spanish footballer
- RJ Luis Jr. (born 2002), American basketball player
