= Lode (name) =

Lode may refer to:

- Lode Aerts (born 1959), bishop of Bruges, Belgium
- Lode Anthonis (1922–1992), Belgian racing cyclist
- Lode Campo (1926–2009), Flemish Belgian business executive
- Lode Ceyssens (born 1972), Flemish politician
- Lode Claes (born 1997), Belgian journalist, lawyer and politician
- Lode Craeybeckx (1897–1976), mayor of Antwerp, Belgium
- Lode Vanoost (born 1953), Belgian politician
- Lode Vereeck (born 1965), Flemish politician
- Lode Wils (1929–2024), Belgian university professor and historian
- Lode Wouters (1929–2014), Belgian cyclist
- Lode Wyns (born 1946), Belgian molecular biologist and professor, former an athlete
- Lode Zielens (1901–1944), Belgian novelist and journalist
- Christoph Lode (born 1977), German novelist
- Holger Lode (born 1967), German specialist for pediatrics
- Marius Lode (born 1993), Norwegian footballer
- Otto Herman Lode (1771–1852)
- Trond Lode (born 1974), Norwegian politician
- William de Lode (died 1403), prior of Spinney Abbey in Cambridgeshire
