= Louis Anthony deLise =

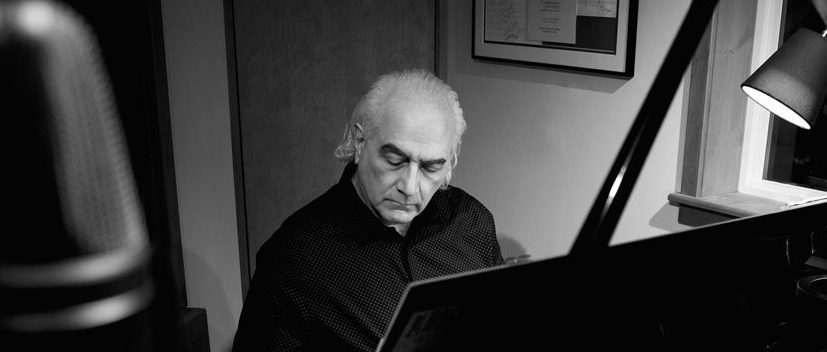

Background information
- Born: December 6, 1949 (age 76); Philadelphia, Pennsylvania
- Genres: Concert, Pop, Ambient, R&B
- Occupations: Composer, arranger, producer, lyricist, conductor, educator
- Instruments: Piano, percussion
- Works: www.louisanthonydelise.com/discography
- Years active: 1966 - present
- Labels: Centaur, Def Soul Classics, Casablanca, Umbrella, Vanguard, TEC, Phil-LA of Soul, EM (Japan), BBE (UK).
- Publishers: ALRY Publications, Metropolis Music Publishing
- Website: louisanthonydelise.com

Louis Anthony deLise (born 6 December 1949) is an American composer, arranger, and record producer. Early in his career, deLise wrote extensively for radio, television, and film. He is a Fellow of the New Jersey State Council on the Arts who has been recognized with awards from The National Flute Association (NFA), The Zone Music Reporter, and others. He was a Member of the Philadelphia Music Industry Task Force.

DeLise earned a Doctor of Musical Arts (DMA) in composition from Temple University’s Boyer College of Music and Dance, where he was Adjunct Lecturer in music theory, songwriting, film scoring and arranging. He was the Executive Director of the Haddonfield School of the Performing Arts in Haddonfield, NJ.

DeLise began his career as a drummer performing with local Philadelphia jazz and pop bands. His work as a studio musician includes recordings with Paul Shaffer, CeCe Winans, Bunny Sigler, Jeff Oster, Carlos Santana, Eric Bazilian, Peter Nero, and Nancy Rumbel.

DeLise was a percussionist and arranger for Peter Nero and the Philly Pops (from 1978 through 2000), percussionist with the Opera Company of Philadelphia (now Opera Philadelphia; from 1975 through 1985), and conductor and arranger for the Concerto Soloists of Philadelphia (now The Chamber Orchestra of Philadelphia) with singer-songwriter, Robert Hazard (1982). During this time, deLise became active as an arranger and conductor in Philadelphia's busy recording scene.

deLise is the author of the songwriting textbook, The Professional Songwriter: Songwriting, Recording and Making Money with Your Music (2019, Bocage Music Publishing/Metropolis Music Publishing).

== Early life ==
DeLise was born in Philadelphia, Pennsylvania, the middle child of first-generation Italian Americans. His family moved to Warrington, Bucks County, Pennsylvania, a then-rural area about 30 miles north of Philadelphia, when he was five years old. Louis attended public schools and graduated from Central Bucks High School (West) where he played percussion and piano in the school's orchestra and stage band.

DeLise began private music lessons at 8 years old with Kenneth Lawrence, a well-respected “territory band” drummer. He was also inspired by the music of his second cousin, jazz pianist Jimmy Amadie.

== Career ==
=== Early career and education ===
In 1966, at 16 years old, deLise collaborated on his first independently released recording with singers Eddie Bruce and Richard Bush, playing both drums and piano on the record.

In 1968, deLise entered Temple University's College of Music (now the Boyer College of Music and Dance) where he majored in composition and orchestral percussion performance. His principal composition teacher at university was Clifford Taylor. His percussion professors were Jack Moore (of the Minnesota Orchestra) and Charles Owen, Principal Percussionist of the Philadelphia Orchestra. He remained an active performing musician and began his studio career as he co-wrote, arranged and conducted the theme for WCAU-10’s daily news broadcast, The Newsroom.

During the summers of his undergraduate study, Louis attended the Ambler Music Festival (later the Temple Music Festival), participating in the composition seminars of Vincent Persichetti, George Crumb, and George Rochberg. During this time his Two Dances for Marimba and Orchestra was read by the Pittsburgh Symphony.

DeLise left his undergraduate studies for about a year to pursue performance opportunities as a set drummer, studio musician, and an arranger/conductor. He returned to his studies and earn his Bachelor of Music in composition in 1974.

=== 1970s ===
In 1975, deLise earned his first Billboard magazine “Pick Hit” for an R&B record called "Later Than You Think" by The Coalitions. for which he was arranger, conductor, pianist and percussionist Other successful records soon followed including The J’s “When Did You Stop” (produced, arranged, and co-written by deLise with Michael Kurman, Jr. in 1977); a Billboard Disco Top 100 single, “J’Ouvert,” by John Gibbs with the Jam Band.

By the late 1970s, deLise began to work with publishers and producers in New York City. In 1979, he arranged and conducted sessions in New York City and Philadelphia for producer Danny Weiss for artist Chris Hills and for The Diamond Dolls release on the Vanguard Records label. While working in Manhattan, deLise studied composition with Stanley Wolfe at the Juilliard School’s Extension Division and studied film scoring with composer Don Sebesky.

=== 1980s ===
In 1980, deLise was co-producer, co-writer, arranger and conductor for William DeVaughn’s second hit album, Figures Can’t Calculate appeared in both the Billboard "Top Single Pick" (recommended) and Record World "Black Oriented Singles".

In 1984, deLise founded the broadcast production music company MusiCrafters, Inc for which he was its principal composer, arranger, and producer. For MusiCrafters, deLise composed hundreds of production music library tracks and scored films and television programs for clients including Capital Cities Communications, PBS, CBS, Johnson & Johnson, Bristol-Meyers/Squibb, Pep-Boys, Sunoco, Merck, Janssen Pharmaceutica, DuPont and many others.

=== 1990s ===
During the 1990s, deLise continued his work as a percussionist and arranger with Peter Nero and the Philly Pops, teaching at Temple University, and writing music for several television programs, including PrimeTime, a weekend magazine show on WPVI-TV. In addition, he was composer/music director and conductor of the orchestra for the inaugural show and presentations of the Barrymore Awards in Philadelphia.

In 1996, with a major grant from the Pew Charitable Trust, deLise created, wrote scripts, and produced the radio program series, Notes from Philadelphia. The program was broadcast on National Public Radio (NPR) affiliate WRTI-FM in Philadelphia. Guests on the interview program included mezzo-soprano Marietta Simpson, and pianists Garry Graffman and Peter Nero. deLise also composed the program’s theme music.

=== 2000s ===
With the turn of the new century, deLise re-entered the Philadelphia record production business when he was hired in 2004 to work on a new album, Timeless Journey, by Patti LaBelle. Louis wrote and conducted the string orchestra arrangement for "2 Steps Away," one of two singles from the album, written by deLise’s elder son, Jonathan DeLise. DeLise was also string orchestra arranger and conductor for Patti LaBelle’s next album, The Gospel According to Patti LaBelle.

In 2011, deLise was commissioned to write an expanded orchestral arrangement of “2 Steps Away” for Ms. LaBelle and the U.S. Marine Chamber Orchestra as they appeared on A Concert for Hope, a televised commemoration of the September 11 attacks.

In 2015, deLise released new and re-arranged versions of compositions from his northern soul catalogue and gained international attention.

Since 2015, deLise has turned almost exclusively to the composition of chamber music and the production of what he calls, “Post Genre” instrumental recordings. Working with print publishers, ALRY Publications and Metropolis Music Publishers, deLise has composed several successful compositions including his concerto, Salone del Astor that was named, “Best Newly Published Mixed Duet” by the National Flute Association (NFA) in 2019 and Flouting Convention, nominated in the NFA’s 2025 awards.

deLise’s critically acclaimed Post Genre albums include

- Natural Light (2019; featuring Nancy Rumbel and Jeff Oster)
- A Gift of Moments (2021)
- To Dance with You (2022; featuring John McMurtery and Anne Sullivan)
- Close Enough to Perfect (2022)
- Red Lotus (2022; featuring John McMurtery, Charles Abramovic, Luigi Mazzocchi, and Vivian Barton Dozor)
- Iridescence (2024; featuring John McMurtery, Nancy Rumbel, Bruce McFarland and Vivian Barton)

In 2022, deLise orchestrated Robin Spielberg’s album, By Way of the Wind. The album, recorded in Hungary with the Budapest Scoring Orchestra, won many awards, including from Clouzine International Magazine, and the Global Music Awards. It appeared in the top ten of Billboard magazine’s “Classical Crossover” chart for several weeks in 2023.

== Compositions ==
Piano

- American Darkness
- Autumn Twilight
- But Not Forgotten
- Early January
- In the Edge of the Water
- Mosaic
- Natural Light
- And Then She Was Gone
- Spring Rain
- Three Little Dancers
- Winter's Chill
- Variations on Moonlight

Flute Solo

- Watermarks (flute solo)

Flute and Piano

- Salone del Astor (flute and piano; flute and vibraphone)
- Miniatures

Flute and Harp

- Passaggio (flute and harp)
- Giocara (flute and harp)
- Celebrations (flute and harp)
- Seminare (flute and harp)

Flute and Clarinet

- Flouting Convention (flute and clarinet)

Ensembles

- Red Lotus (flute, violin, cello and piano)
- Dreamstates (flute quartet, vibraphone solo)
- Fantasy on Amazing Grace (flute choir, percussion ensemble)

Voices

- We Praise You Father, Forever (SATB)
- Silent Night (SATB)
- Gentle Heart (SAB)
- Fantasy on Amazing Grace (SATB)

Voice and Piano

- Calabrian Songs (baritone and piano)

Percussion

- Three Out of Five (percussion ensemble)
- Fantasy on Amazing Grace (percussion ensemble)
- Dreamstates (vibraphone solo)
- Two Dances (marimba and piano)
