= Ludvík =

Ludvík or Ludvik is a given name. Notable people with the name include:

- Ludvík Aškenazy (1921–1986), Czech writer and journalist
- Ludvik Buland (1893–1945), Norwegian trade unionist
- Ludvík Čelanský (1870–1931), Czech conductor and composer
- Ludvík Daněk (1937–1998), Czechoslovak discus thrower, who won gold in Athletics at the 1972 Summer Olympics
- Ludvík Klíma (1912–1973), Czechoslovak sprint canoeist who competed in the late 1930s and late 1940s
- Ludvík Kuba (1863–1956), Czech landscape painter, musician, writer, professor in the Academy of Fine Arts
- Ludvík Kundera (1920–2010), Czech writer, translator, poet, playwright, editor and literary historian
- Johan Ludvik Løvald (born 1943), Norwegian diplomat
- Ludvík Podéšť (1921–1968), Czech composer, conductor, music journalist and editor
- Ludvík Ráža (1929–2000), Czech film director
- Ludvík Souček (1926–1978), probably the best-known author of science fiction in Czechoslovakia
- Ludvík Svoboda (1895–1979), Czechoslovak general and politician
- Ludvík Vébr (born 1960), Czech rower who competed for Czechoslovakia in the 1972 and 1976 Summer Olympics
- Ludvík Vaculík (1926–2015), Czech writer and journalist

== See also ==
- Lodewijk
