= Ludwig (given name) =

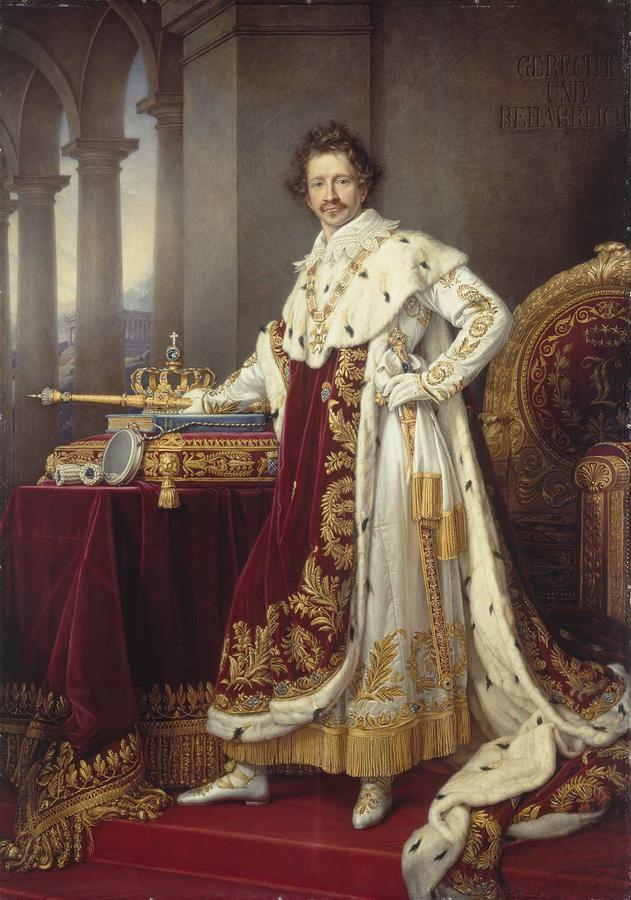
- Portrait of Ludwig I of Bavaria by Joseph Karl Stieler, 1826
- Pronunciation: German: [ˈluːtvɪç]
- Gender: Male

Origin
- Origin: German
- Meaning: Famous warrior

Other names
- Related names: Alois, Aloysius, Clovis, Lajos, Lewis, Lodewijk, Lodewyk, Loïc, Louis, Ludovic, Ludovico, Ludvig, Ludvík, Ludwik, Luigi, Luis, Luiz, Ludovica

Ludwig is a German name, deriving from Old High German Hludwīg, also spelled Hluotwīg. Etymologically, the name can be traced back to the reconstructed Proto-Germanic name *hlūdawiganaz, which is composed of two elements: *hlūdaz ("loud, famous") and *wiganą ("to battle, to fight") respectively, the resulting name meaning "famous warrior" or "famous in battle". The name Louis is a derivative of Ludwig.

The name is pronounced in German as /ˈluːtvɪç/, with the second syllable pronounced as /v/ rather than English /w/.

Notable people and characters with the name include:

== People ==
Note: Individuals may appear in more than one subsection.

=== German nobles ===
- Ludwig I, count of Württemberg (1143–1158)
- Ludwig II, count of Württemberg (1158–1181)
- Ludwig I, count of Württemberg-Urach (1419–1450)
- Ludwig II, count of Württemberg-Urach (1450–1457)
- Ludwig IV, landgrave of Thuringia (1200–1227)
- Ludwig I of Bavaria, king of Bavaria (1825–1848)
- Ludwig II of Bavaria, king of Bavaria (1864–1886)
- Ludwig III of Bavaria, last king of Bavaria (1913–1918)
- Ludwig V (disambiguation)
- Ludwig IV, Grand Duke of Hesse and by Rhine (1877–1892)

=== Architects ===
- Ludwig Levy, German architect
- Ludwig Mies van der Rohe, German-American architect

=== Artists ===
- Ludwig Burger, German painter and illustrator
- Ernst Ludwig Kirchner, German painter and printmaker
- Ludwig Merwart, Austrian painter and graphic artist
- Ludwig Mestler, Austrian artist noted for his watercolor painting
- Ludwig Richter, German painter

=== Authors and poets ===
- Ludwig Bemelmans, American author and children's book writer and illustrator
- Ludwig Thoma, German author
- Ludwig Tieck, German poet
- Ludwig Uhland, German poet
- Ludwig Lavater, Swiss author

=== Composers, conductors and musicians ===
- Ludwig van Beethoven (1770–1827), German composer and pianist
- Ludwig Göransson, Swedish composer, conductor, and record producer
- Ludwig Minkus, Austrian composer and violin virtuoso
- Ludwig Spohr (1784–1859), German composer, violinist and conductor

=== Philosophers ===
- Ludwig Feuerbach (1804–1872), German philosopher and anthropologist
- Ludwig Wittgenstein (1889–1951), Austrian philosopher

=== Politicians ===
- Ludwig von Cobenzl (1753–1809), Austrian Habsburg diplomat and politician
- Ludwig Erhard (1897–1977), German economist and West German chancellor
- Ludwig Grass (1789–1860), Liechtensteiner physician and politician
- Ludwig Keke (born c. 1935), Nauruan politician and diplomat
- Ludwig Marxer (1867–1962), Deputy Prime Minister of Liechtenstein
- Ludwig Mecklinger (1919–1994), East German politician and academic
- Ludwig Schulze, Papua New Guinean politician
- Ludwig Scotty (1948–2026), Nauruan politician, twice president of Nauru

=== Scientists ===
- Ludwig Aschoff, German physician and pathologist
- Ludwig von Bertalanffy (1901–1972), Austrian-born biologist
- Ludwig Binswanger, Swiss psychiatrist
- Ludwig Boltzmann, Austrian physicist
- Ludwig Feuerbach (1804–1872), German anthropologist and philosopher
- Ludwig von Mises, Austrian economist
- Ludwig Mond, German chemist
- Ludwig Prandtl, German physicist
- Ludwig Reichenbach, German botanist
- Ludwig Schläfli, Swiss geometer
- Ludwig von Graff, an Austrian zoologist

=== Soldiers ===
- Ludwig Beck, German World War II general involved in the 20 July plot to assassinate Hitler
- Ludwig von Benedek, Austrian general (Feldzeugmeister) of Hungarian descent
- Ludwig Crüwell, German World War II general
- Ludwig Kübler, German General der Gebirgstruppe
- Ludwig Plagge (1910–1948), German SS officer at Auschwitz, Buchenwald and Majdanek concentration camps executed for war crimes
- Ludwig Runzheimer, German Nazi Gestapo officer executed for war crimes

=== Others ===
- Ludwig W. Adamec (1924–2019), American academic and historian
- Ludwig Ahgren (born 1995), American YouTuber and live streamer
- Ludwig Breitenbach (1813–1885), German classical scholar
- Ludwig von Erlichshausen (1410–1467), Grand Master of the Teutonic Knights
- Ludwig Fischer (1905–1947), German Nazi lawyer and government official executed for war crimes
- Ludwig Gehre, German resistance fighter during World War II
- Ludwig Gumplowicz (1838–1909), Polish sociologist, jurist, historian, and political scientist
- Ludwig Kaiser, (born 1990), German professional wrestler
- Ludwig Leichhardt, Prussian explorer
- Ludwig Minelli (1932–2025), Swiss lawyer and euthanasia activist
- Ludwig Müller (1883–1945), German leader of the Protestant Reich Church
- Ludwig Ingwer Nommensen, German Lutheran missionary to North Sumatra, Dutch East Indies
- Ludwig Ortiz, Venezuelan judoka
- Ludwig Roselius (1874–1943), German coffee baron and company founder
- Ludwig Rödl, German chess master
- Ludwig Rübekeil, German philologist
- Ludwig Trepte, German actor
- Ludwig Zamenhof (1859–1917), creator of artificial language Esperanto

== Fictional characters ==
- Ludwig von Drake, in Walt Disney cartoons and comic books
- Ludwig von Koopa, one of the Koopalings from the Mario franchise
- Ludwig Beilschmidt, otherwise known as Germany, in the anime series Axis Powers Hetalia
