= Ludwik =

Ludwik ([ˈludvik]) is a Polish given name, an equivalent of the names: Ludwig and Louis.

Notable people with the name include:

- Ludwik Czyżewski, Polish WWII general
- Ludwik Fleck (1896–1961), Polish medical doctor and biologist
- Ludwik Gintel (1899–1973), Polish-Israeli Olympic soccer player
- Ludwik Hirszfeld (1884–1954), Polish microbiologist
- Ludwik Krzywicki (1859–1941), Polish economist and sociologist
- Ludwik Marian Kurnatowski, Polish crime writer
- Ludwik Lawiński (1887–1971), Polish film actor
- Ludwik Mlokosiewicz (1831–1909), Polish explorer, zoologist and botanist
- Ludwik Mycielski (1854–1926), Polish politician
- Ludwik Rajchman (1881–1965), Polish bacteriologist
- Ludwik Silberstein (1872–1948), Polish-American physicist that helped make special relativity and general relativity staples of university coursework
- Ludwik Starski (1903–1984), Polish lyricist and screenwriter
- Ludwik Waryński (1856–1889), Polish activist and theoretician of the socialist movement
- Ludwik Zamenhof (1859–1917), Polish medical doctor, writer, and inventor of Esperanto.

Other people include:

- Ignace Reiss (1899-1937), Soviet spy whose best-known cover name was "Ludwik."
