= 1983 in the United States =

- Decades: 1960s; 1970s; 1980s; 1990s; 2000s
- See also: History of the United States (1980–1991); Timeline of United States history (1970–1989); List of years in the United States

Events from the year 1983 in the United States.

== Incumbents ==
=== Federal government ===
- President: Ronald Reagan (R-California)
- Vice President: George H. W. Bush (R-Texas)
- Chief Justice: Warren E. Burger (Virginia)
- Speaker of the House of Representatives: Tip O'Neill (D-Massachusetts)
- Senate Majority Leader: Howard Baker (R-Tennessee)
- Congress: 97th (until January 3), 98th (starting January 3)

==== State governments ====
Governors and lieutenant governors

=== Governors ===
- Governor of Alabama: Fob James (Democratic) (until January 17), George Wallace (Democratic) (starting January 17)
- Governor of Alaska: Bill Sheffield (Democratic)
- Governor of Arizona: Bruce Babbitt (Democratic)
- Governor of Arkansas: Frank D. White (Republican) (until January 11), Bill Clinton (Democratic) (starting January 11)
- Governor of California: Jerry Brown (Democratic) (until January 3), George Deukmejian (Republican) (starting January 3)
- Governor of Colorado: Richard Lamm (Democratic)
- Governor of Connecticut: William A O'Neill (Democratic)
- Governor of Delaware: Pierre S. du Pont, IV (Republican)
- Governor of Florida: Bob Graham (Democratic)
- Governor of Georgia: George Busbee (Democratic) (until January 11), Joe Frank Harris (Democratic) (starting January 11)
- Governor of Hawaii: George Ariyoshi (Democratic)
- Governor of Idaho: John V. Evans (Democratic)
- Governor of Illinois: James R. Thompson (Republican)
- Governor of Indiana: Robert D. Orr (Republican)
- Governor of Iowa: Robert D. Ray (Republican) (until January 14), Terry E. Branstad (Republican) (starting January 14)
- Governor of Kansas: John W. Carlin (Democratic)
- Governor of Kentucky: John Y. Brown Jr. (Democratic) (until December 13), Martha Layne Collins (Democratic) (starting December 13)
- Governor of Louisiana: David C. Treen (Republican)
- Governor of Maine: Joseph E. Brennan (Democratic)
- Governor of Maryland: Harry R. Hughes (Democratic)
- Governor of Massachusetts: Edward J. King (Democratic) (until January 6), Michael Dukakis (Democratic) (starting January 6)
- Governor of Michigan: William Milliken (Republican) (until January 1), James Blanchard (Democratic) (starting January 1)
- Governor of Minnesota: Al Quie (Republican) (until January 3), Rudy Perpich (Democratic) (starting January 3)
- Governor of Mississippi: William Winter (Democratic)
- Governor of Missouri: Kit Bond (Republican)
- Governor of Montana: Ted Schwinden (Democratic)
- Governor of Nebraska: Charles Thone (Republican) (until January 6), Bob Kerrey (Democratic) (starting January 6)
- Governor of Nevada: Robert List (Republican) (until January 3), Richard Bryan (Democratic) (starting January 3)
- Governor of New Hampshire: Vesta M. Roy (Republican) (until January 6), John H. Sununu (Republican) (starting January 6)
- Governor of New Jersey: Thomas Kean (Republican)
- Governor of New Mexico: Bruce King (Democratic) (until January 1), Toney Anaya (Democratic) (starting January 1)
- Governor of New York: Mario Cuomo (Democratic) (starting January 1)
- Governor of North Carolina: Jim Hunt (Democratic)
- Governor of North Dakota: Allen I. Olson (Republican)
- Governor of Ohio: Jim Rhodes (Republican) (until January 10), Dick Celeste (Democratic) (starting January 10)
- Governor of Oklahoma: George Nigh (Democratic)
- Governor of Oregon: Victor G. Atiyeh (Republican)
- Governor of Pennsylvania: Dick Thornburgh (Republican)
- Governor of Rhode Island: J. Joseph Garrahy (Democratic)
- Governor of South Carolina: Richard Riley (Democratic)
- Governor of South Dakota: William J. Janklow (Republican)
- Governor of Tennessee: Lamar Alexander (Republican)
- Governor of Texas: Bill Clements (Republican) (until January 18), Mark White (Democratic) (starting January 18)
- Governor of Utah: Scott M. Matheson (Democratic)
- Governor of Vermont: Richard A. Snelling (Republican)
- Governor of Virginia: Chuck Robb (Democratic)
- Governor of Washington: John Spellman (Republican)
- Governor of West Virginia: Jay Rockefeller (Democratic)
- Governor of Wisconsin: Lee S. Dreyfus (Republican) (until January 3), Tony Earl (Democratic) (starting January 3)
- Governor of Wyoming: Edgar J. Herschler (Democratic)

=== Lieutenant governors ===
- Lieutenant Governor of Alabama: George McMillan (Democratic) (until January 17), Bill Baxley (Democratic) (starting January 17)
- Lieutenant Governor of Alaska: Stephen McAlpine (Democratic)
- Lieutenant Governor of Arkansas: Winston Bryant (Democratic)
- Lieutenant Governor of California: Mike Curb (Republican) (until January 3), Leo T. McCarthy (Democratic) (starting January 3)
- Lieutenant Governor of Colorado: Nancy Dick (Democratic)
- Lieutenant Governor of Connecticut: Joseph J. Fauliso (Democratic)
- Lieutenant Governor of Delaware: Michael N. Castle (Republican)
- Lieutenant Governor of Florida: Wayne Mixson (Democratic)
- Lieutenant Governor of Georgia: Zell Miller (Democratic)
- Lieutenant Governor of Hawaii: John D. Waihee III (Democratic)
- Lieutenant Governor of Idaho: Phil Batt (Democratic) (until January 3), David H. Leroy (Republican) (starting January 3)
- Lieutenant Governor of Illinois: vacant (until January 10), George H. Ryan (Republican) (starting January 10)
- Lieutenant Governor of Indiana: John Mutz (Republican)
- Lieutenant Governor of Iowa: Terry E. Branstad (Republican) (until January 14), Robert T. Anderson (Democratic) (starting January 14)
- Lieutenant Governor of Kansas: Paul V. Dugan (Democratic) (until January 10), Thomas R. Docking (Democratic) (starting January 10)
- Lieutenant Governor of Kentucky: Martha Layne Collins (Democratic) (until December 13), Steve Beshear (Democratic) (starting December 13)
- Lieutenant Governor of Louisiana: Robert "Bobby" Freeman (Democratic)
- Lieutenant Governor of Maryland: vacant (until January 19), J. Joseph Curran (Democratic) (starting January 19)
- Lieutenant Governor of Massachusetts: Thomas P. O'Neill III (Democratic) (until March 6), John Kerry (Democratic) (starting March 6)
- Lieutenant Governor of Michigan: vacant (until January 1), Martha W. Griffiths (Democratic) (starting January 1)
- Lieutenant Governor of Minnesota: Lou Wangberg (Republican) (until January 3), Marlene Johnson (Democratic) (starting January 3)
- Lieutenant Governor of Mississippi: Brad Dye (Democratic)
- Lieutenant Governor of Missouri: Kenneth Rothman (Democratic)
- Lieutenant Governor of Montana: George Turman (Democratic)
- Lieutenant Governor of Nebraska: Roland Luedtke (Republican) (until January 6), Donald F. McGinley (Democratic) (starting January 6)
- Lieutenant Governor of Nevada: Myron E. Leavitt (Democratic) (until January 3), Bob Cashell (Democratic) (starting January 3)
- Lieutenant Governor of New Mexico: Roberto Mondragón (Democratic) (until January 1), Mike Runnels (Democratic) (starting January 1)
- Lieutenant Governor of New York: Alfred DelBello (Democratic) (starting January 1)
- Lieutenant Governor of North Carolina: James C. Green (Democratic)
- Lieutenant Governor of North Dakota: Ernest Sands (Republican)
- Lieutenant Governor of Ohio: vacant (until January 10), Myrl H. Shoemaker (Democratic) (starting January 10)
- Lieutenant Governor of Oklahoma: Spencer Bernard (Democratic)
- Lieutenant Governor of Pennsylvania: William Scranton, III (Republican)
- Lieutenant Governor of Rhode Island: Thomas R. DiLuglio (Democratic)
- Lieutenant Governor of South Carolina: Nancy Stevenson (Democratic) (until January 12), Michael R. Daniel (Democratic) (starting January 12)
- Lieutenant Governor of South Dakota: Lowell C. Hansen II (Republican)
- Lieutenant Governor of Tennessee: John S. Wilder (Democratic)
- Lieutenant Governor of Texas: William P. Hobby Jr. (Democratic)
- Lieutenant Governor of Utah: David Smith Monson (Republican)
- Lieutenant Governor of Vermont: Madeleine M. Kunin (Democratic) (until January 10), Peter Plympton Smith (Republican) (starting January 10)
- Lieutenant Governor of Virginia: Richard Joseph Davis (Democratic)
- Lieutenant Governor of Washington: John Cherberg (Democratic)
- Lieutenant Governor of Wisconsin: Russell A. Olson (Republican) (until January 3), James Flynn (Democratic) (starting January 3)

== Events ==
=== January ===
- January 1 – The New Jersey Transit Police Department is created in the state of New Jersey.
- January 2 – The musical Annie is performed for the last time after 2,377 shows at the Alvin Theatre on Broadway, New York City.
- January 3 – Kilauea begins slowly erupting on the Big Island of Hawaii. On December 5, 2018, after 90 days of inactivity from the volcano, the eruption that started in 1983 was declared to be over.
- January 18 – The International Olympic Committee restores Native American athlete Jim Thorpe's Olympic medals to his family.
- January 19 – Apple Inc. releases the Apple Lisa personal computer.
- January 25 – President Reagan delivers his second State of the Union Address to the 98th Congress.
- January 26 – Lotus 1-2-3 is released for IBM-PC compatible computers.
- January 30 – The Washington Redskins defeat the Miami Dolphins by a score of 27–17 in Super Bowl XVII.

=== February ===
- February 18 – Wah Mee massacre: 13 people are killed in an attempted robbery in Seattle, Washington.
- February 23
  - The United States Environmental Protection Agency announces its intention to buy out and evacuate the dioxin-contaminated community of Times Beach, Missouri.
  - Failure of automatic shut-down at Salem Nuclear Power Plant, New Jersey, USA.
- February 24 – A special commission of the Congress of the United States releases a report critical of the practice of Japanese internment during World War II.
- February 28 – The final episode of M*A*S*H airs, setting a new record for most-watched television broadcast in American history.

=== March ===
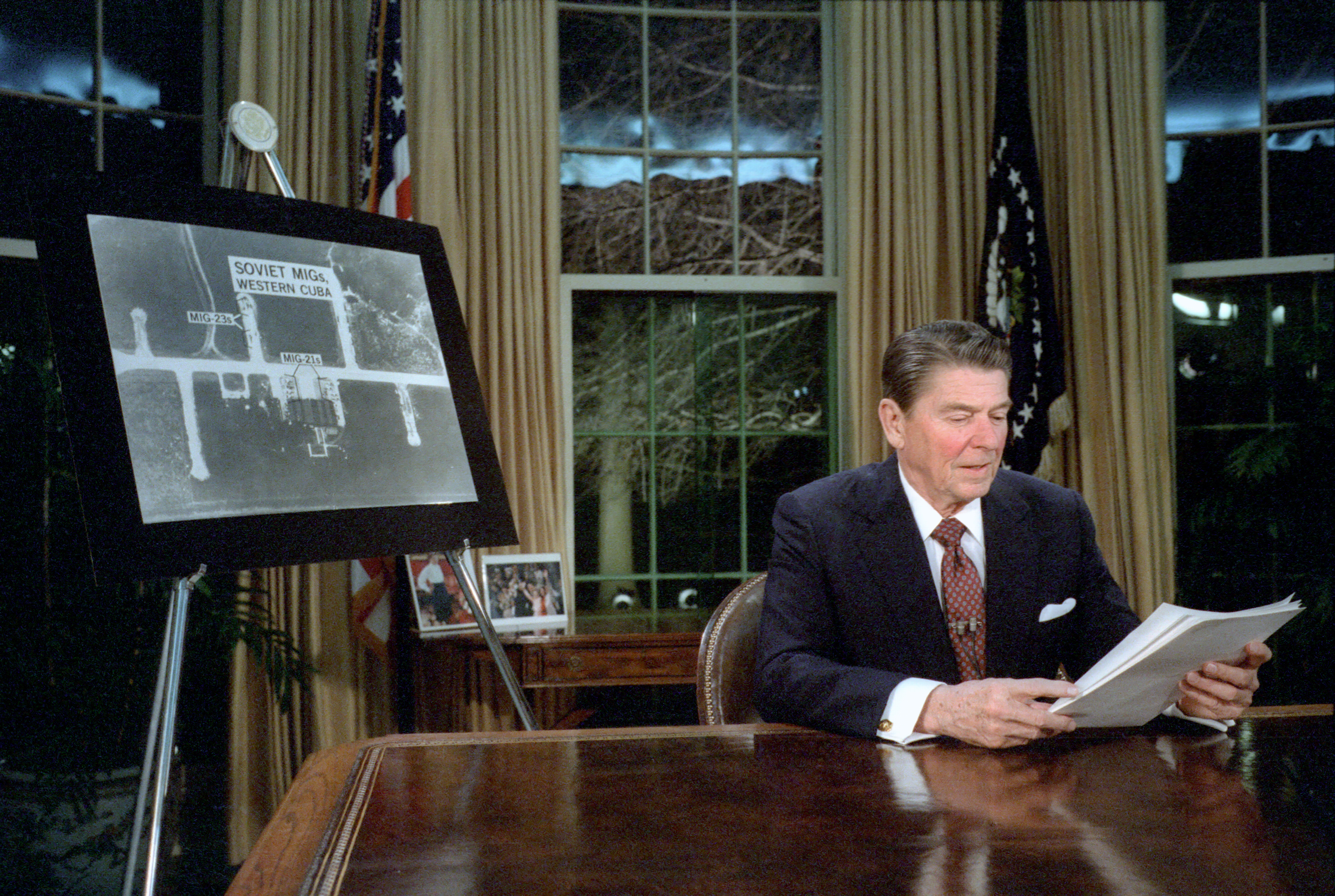
March 23: Ronald Reagan announces the Strategic Defense Initiative

- March 3 – Musician/TV host Peter Ivers is fatally bludgeoned by an intruder in his Los Angeles apartment. The perpetrator is never identified.
- March 8 – IBM releases the IBM PC XT.
- March 9 – Anne Burford resigns as head of the United States Environmental Protection Agency amid scandal.
- March 22 – Judith Neelley is convicted of the kidnap and murder of 13 year old Lisa Millican in Georgia and sentenced to death. Her sentence is later reduced to life imprisonment.
- March 23 – Strategic Defense Initiative: President Ronald Reagan makes his initial proposal to develop technology to intercept enemy missiles. The media dub this plan "Star Wars".
- March 25
  - Motown celebrates its 25th anniversary with the television special Motown 25: Yesterday, Today, Forever, during which Michael Jackson performs Billie Jean and introduces the moonwalk.
  - Rob Lowe's feature film debut The Outsiders is released.

=== April ===
- April 11 – The 55th Academy Awards, hosted by Liza Minnelli, Dudley Moore, Richard Pryor and Walter Matthau, are held at Dorothy Chandler Pavilion in Los Angeles. Richard Attenborough's Gandhi receives 11 nominations and wins eight awards, including Best Picture and Best Director. Louis Gossett Jr. also becomes the first African-American actor to win Best Supporting Actor for his role in An Officer and a Gentleman.
- April 18
  - The April 1983 U.S. Embassy bombing in Beirut kills 63 people.
  - The Disney Channel is initiated on American cable TV.
- April 25 – Manchester, Maine schoolgirl Samantha Smith is invited to visit the Soviet Union by its leader Yuri Andropov, after he read her letter in which she expressed fears about nuclear war.

=== May ===
- May 2 – The 6.2 M_{w} Coalinga earthquake shakes central California with a maximum Mercalli intensity of VIII (Severe), causing 94 injuries and $10 million in losses.
- May 17 – Lebanon, Israel, and the United States sign an agreement on Israeli withdrawal from Lebanon.
- May 25
  - National Missing Children's Day is proclaimed by President Ronald Reagan, exactly four years after Etan Patz's disappearance.
  - Return of the Jedi, the 3rd of the projected 12 Star Wars films produced by George Lucas, is released in the United States. The original Star Wars was released 6 years to the day previously on May 25, 1977.
- May 27 – Benton fireworks disaster: A powerful explosion at an unlicensed fireworks factory in Benton, Tennessee kills 11 and injures one.
- May 28 – The 9th G7 summit begins in Williamsburg, Virginia.
- May 29
  - Tom Sneva wins the Indianapolis 500 motor race
  - Neil Bonnett wins the 24th running of the world 600 at Charlotte Motor Speedway.
- May 31 – The Philadelphia 76ers sweep the Los Angeles Lakers in four games to win the championship for the 1982–83 NBA season. Philadelphia's Moses Malone is named NBA Finals MVP.

=== June ===
- June – Throughout the local summer, many Midwestern American states are affected by a severe drought that causes water shortages.
- June 4 – Fugitive tax protester Gordon Kahl, who has been on the run for four months, is killed in a shootout with police in Smithville, Arkansas, along with a local sheriff.
- June 5 – Irish rock band U2,performs a live recording concert of Under A Blood Red Sky at Red Rocks Amphitheatre as part of War(Tour) in Morrison, Colorado attended by 4,400 youths mostly university students.
- June 13 – Pioneer 10 becomes the first man-made object to leave the Solar System.
- June 16 – Cork Graham is caught off the Vietnamese island of Phú Quốc looking for treasure buried by Captain Kidd. He is convicted and imprisoned until 1984 for illegal entry.
- June 18 – STS-7: Sally Ride becomes the first American woman in space, on the Space Shuttle Challenger.

=== July ===
- July 7 – Samantha Smith flies to the Soviet Union (see April 25).
- July 11 – Reading Rainbow debuts on PBS.
- July 23 – Diana Ross's concert at The Great Lawn of New York City's Central Park, attended by 800,000 fans, is cut short by a massive lightning storm.
- July 25 – The world's first dedicated hospital ward for HIV/AIDS patients opens at San Francisco General Hospital.

=== August ===
- August 1 – America West Airlines begins operations in Phoenix, Arizona, and Las Vegas, Nevada.
- August 18 – Hurricane Alicia hits the Texas coast, killing 22 and causing over US$3.8 billion (2005 dollars) in damage.
- August 24 – The Philadelphia Arena is destroyed by arson.
- August 30 – STS-8: Space Shuttle Challenger carries Guion S. Bluford, the first African-American astronaut, into space.

=== September ===
- September 1 – Cold War: Korean Air Lines Flight 007 is shot down by a Soviet Union jet fighter when the commercial aircraft enters Soviet airspace. All 269 on board are killed, including U.S. Representative Larry McDonald.
- September 5 – Tom Brokaw becomes lead anchor for NBC Nightly News.
- September 15 – Huey Lewis and the News's album Sports is released.
- September 16 – President Ronald Reagan announces that the Global Positioning System (GPS) will be made available for civilian use.
- September 17
  - Vanessa Lynn Williams becomes the first African-American to be crowned Miss America, in Atlantic City, New Jersey.
  - The Charlie Brown and Snoopy Show, a TV series based on the Peanuts comic strip, premiered on CBS, as part of the CBS Superstar Saturday.
- September 18 – U.S. heavy metal band Kiss officially appears in public without makeup for the first time on MTV.

=== October ===
- October 4
  - Richard Noble sets a new land speed record of 633.468 mph, driving Thrust 2 at the Black Rock Desert, Nevada.
  - The first Hooters restaurant opens in Clearwater, Florida.
- October 16 – World Series: The Baltimore Orioles defeat the Philadelphia Phillies 5–0 in Game 5, to win the series 4 games to 1 for their 3rd World Championship.
- October 23 – Simultaneous suicide truck-bombings destroy both the French and the United States Marine Corps barracks in Beirut, killing 241 U.S. servicemen, 58 French paratroopers and 6 Lebanese civilians.
- October 25
  - United States troops invade Grenada at the behest of Eugenia Charles of Dominica, a member of the Organization of American States.
  - Microsoft Word is first released.
- October 28 – The 6.9 M_{w} Borah Peak earthquake shook central Idaho with a maximum Mercalli intensity of IX (Violent), causing two deaths, three injuries, and $12.5 million in losses.

=== November ===
- November 2
  - Martin Luther King Jr. Day: At the White House Rose Garden, U.S. President Ronald Reagan signs a bill creating a federal holiday on the third Monday of every January to honor American civil rights leader Martin Luther King Jr. It is first observed in 1986.
  - Chrysler introduces the Dodge Caravan, the first "minivan".
- November 3 – The Reverend Jesse Jackson announces his candidacy for the 1984 Democratic Party presidential nomination.
- November 7 – 1983 U.S. Senate bombing: A bomb explodes in the United States Senate with the intent to kill Republican senators however nobody was killed. The perpetrators were part of the May 19th Communist Organization.
- November 10
  - The anticancer drug etoposide is approved by the FDA, leading to a curative treatment regime in the field of combination chemotherapy of testicular carcinoma.
  - Star 80 released: A film about the true story of Playboy Playmate of the Year Dorothy Stratten, who was murdered by her estranged husband Paul Snider on August 14, 1980.
- November 11 – Ronald Reagan becomes the first U.S. president to address the Diet, Japan's national legislature.
- November 13 – The first United States cruise missiles arrive at Greenham Common Airbase in England amid protests from peace campaigners.
- November 14 – The immunosuppressant cyclosporine is approved by the FDA, leading to a revolution in the field of transplantation.
- November 16 – A jury in Gretna, Louisiana acquits Ginny Foat of the murder of Argentine businessman Moses Chaiyo.
- November 20 – ABC showed the most watched and controversial TV movie of what a real nuclear war would look like called The Day After.
- November 18 – A Christmas Story is released.

=== December ===
- December 2 – Michael Jackson's music video for "Thriller" is broadcast for the first time. It becomes the most often repeated and famous music video of all time, increasing his own popularity and record sales of the album Thriller.
- December 4 – United States Navy aviator Lt's. Mark Lange and Bobby Goodman are shot down in an A-6 Intruder over Lebanon and captured by Syrians; Lt. Lange dies of his injuries; Lt. Goodman is released 30 days later after the intervention of the Reverend Jesse Jackson.
- December 13 – The Denver Nuggets and the visiting Detroit Pistons combine for an NBA record 370 points, with Detroit winning in triple overtime, 186–184.
- December 24 – Miles City, Montana sets the record for the highest mean sea level pressure in the contiguous US with a reading of 31.42 inHg (1064 mb).
- December 27 – A propane explosion in Buffalo, New York kills five firefighters and two civilians.
- December 29 – The Reverend Jesse Jackson travels to Syria to secure the release of U.S. Navy Lieutenant Robert Goodman, who had been in Syrian captivity since being shot down over the country during a reconnaissance mission.
- December 31 – The Apple Macintosh television advertisement is released.

=== Undated ===
- McDonald's introduces the McNugget.
- The Drug Abuse Resistance Education (DARE) program is launched.
- The economy begins a robust recovery following the early 1980s recession.
- Flashdance and Return of the Jedi are box-office hits.
- Kellogg's introduces Crispix cereal.
- Kary Mullis discovers polymerase chain reaction while working for Cetus.
- Chrysler starts production on the first minivans: the Dodge Caravan and Plymouth Voyager.
- The Cabbage Patch Kids dolls make their national debut, their popularity leads to the Cabbage Patch riots.
- A severe drought affects the Midwest, Great Plains and parts of the Southern United States between May and September.

=== Ongoing ===
- Cold War (1947–1991)

== Sport ==
- May 14 – Portland Winter Hawks become the First American team to win the Memorial Cup by defeating the Oshawa Generals 8 to 3. The Final game is played at Memorial Coliseum in Portland, Oregon

== Births ==
=== January ===
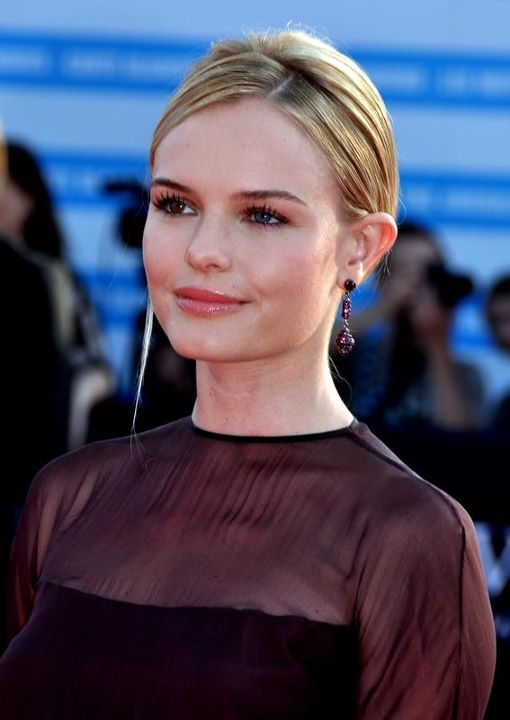
Kate Bosworth

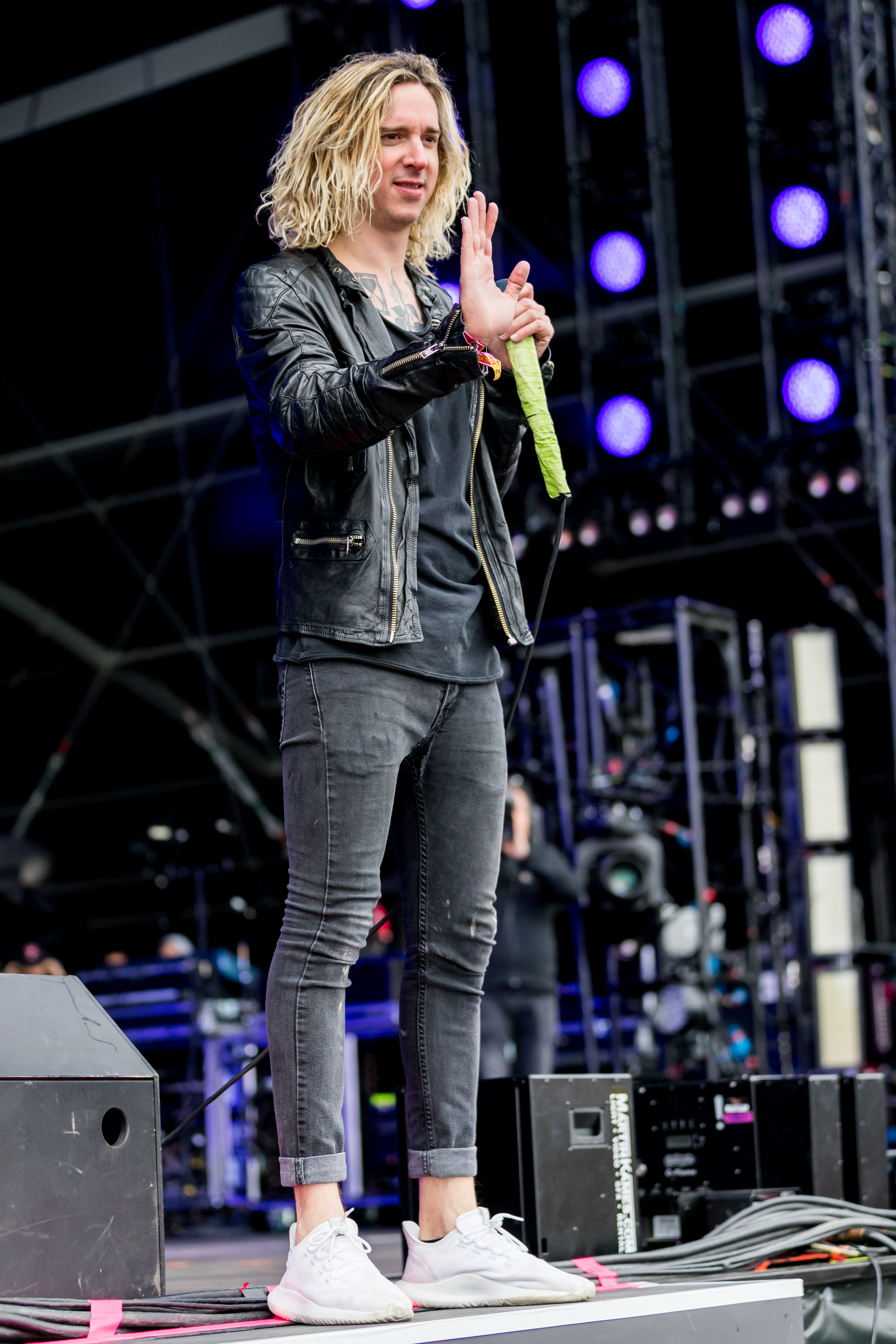
Spencer Chamberlain

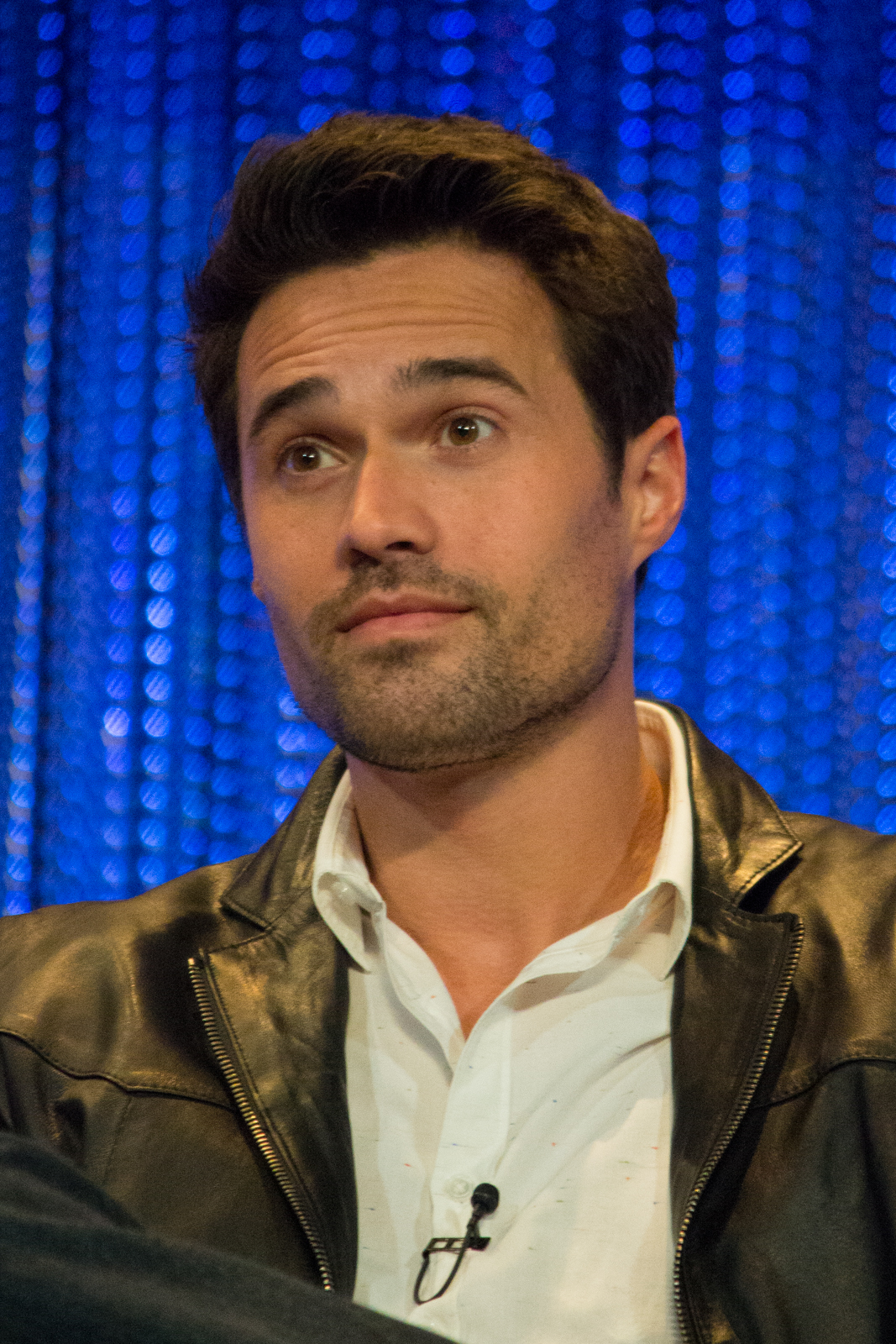
Brett Dalton

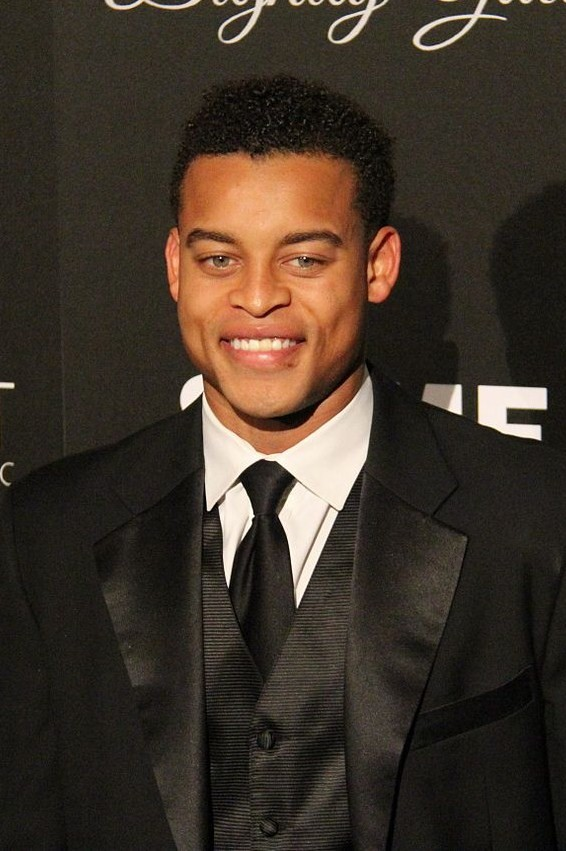
Robert Ri'chard

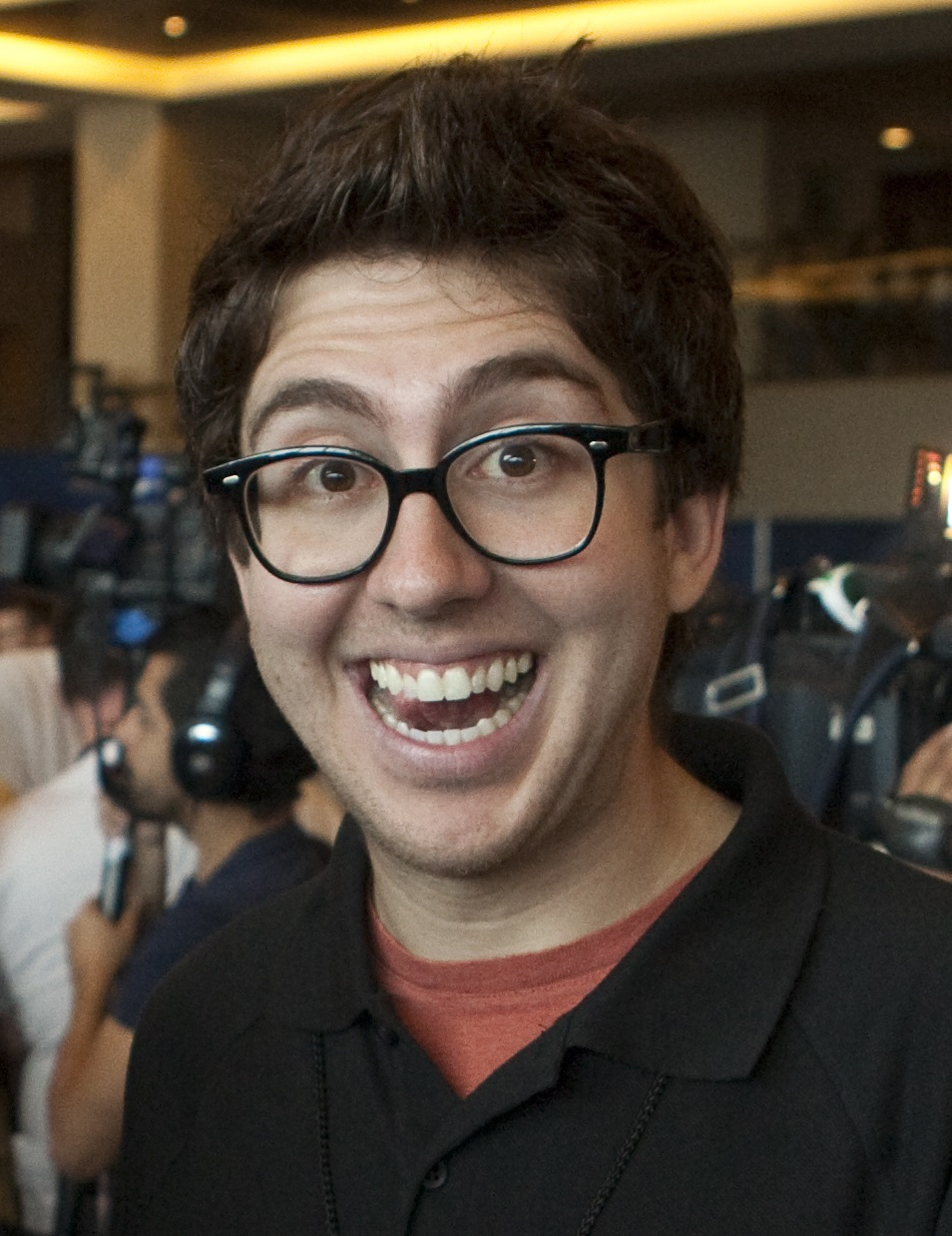
Amir Blumenfeld

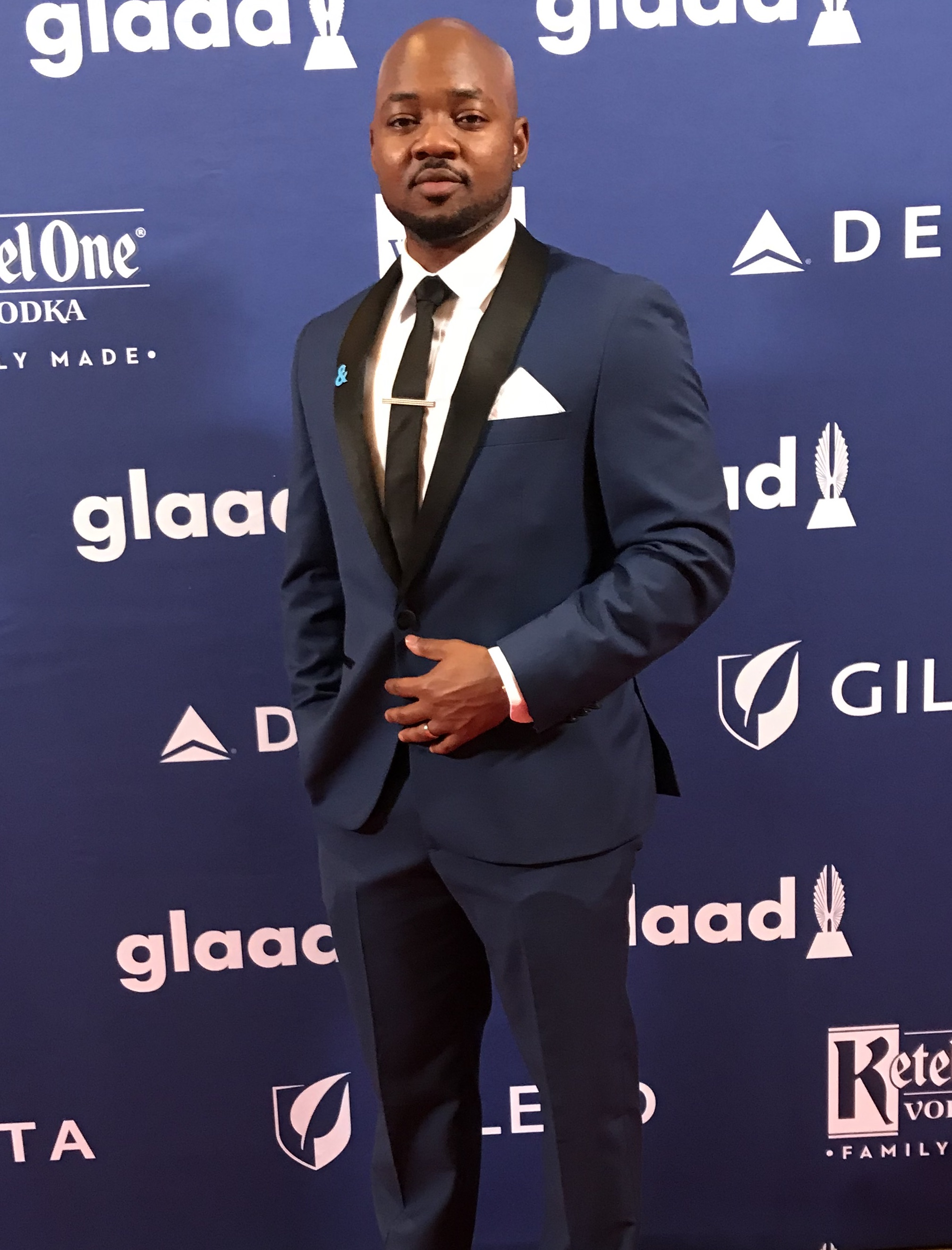
Brian Michael Smith

- January 2
  - Kate Bosworth, actress
  - Anthony Carrigan, actor
  - Ben Driebergen, Marine veteran and television personality
  - Jesse Taylor, mixed martial artist
- January 4
  - Patrick Aleph, singer/songwriter, writer, and rabbi
  - Robbie Bina, ice hockey player
  - Will Bynum, basketball player
  - Spencer Chamberlain, singer/songwriter and frontman for Underoath
  - Jonathan Gannon, football coach
- January 5 – Sean Dockery, basketball player
- January 6
  - Johnny Bedford, mixed martial artist
  - Adam Burish, hockey player
- January 7
  - Tosin Abasi, Nigerian-born musician for Animals As Leaders
  - Brett Dalton, actor
  - Natalie Gulbis, golfer
  - Robert Ri'chard, actor
- January 8 – Chris Masters, wrestler and actor
- January 9
  - Brandon Boggs, baseball player
- January 10 – Tom Gilbert, hockey player
- January 11
  - Turner Battle, basketball player
  - Sarah Blacker, singer/songwriter
  - Dave Shapiro, music agent and businessman (d. 2025)
- January 12 – Eleni Benson, American-born Greek footballer
- January 13
  - William Hung, singer and motivational speaker
  - Brianne Moncrief, actress
- January 14 – Rodney Billups, basketball player
- January 15 – Tim Andrews, stock car racing driver
- January 17 – Rickey D'Shon Collins, actor
- January 18 – Amir Blumenfeld, Israeli-born actor, comedian, television host, and writer
- January 19 – Meredith Andrews, Christian music artist and songwriter
- January 20
  - Matt Albers, baseball player
  - Georgina Bloomberg, equestrian, philanthropist, and owner of the equestrian team New York Empire
  - Douglas Laux, CIA officer and book author (d. 2025)
- January 21 – Alex Acker, American-born Italian basketball player
- January 22 – Shaun Cody, football player
- January 23
  - Nick Antosca, writer, producer, and novelist
  - J. J. Arrington, football player
  - Eric Bassey, football player
- January 24
  - Diane Birch, singer/songwriter
  - Frankie Grande, actor, dancer, television personality, and producer
  - Scott Speed, formula one driver
- January 25 – Brian Armstrong, business executive and CEO of Coinbase
- January 26 – Tyler August, politician
- January 27
  - Deon Anderson, football player
  - Nathan Dahm, politician
  - Gavin Floyd, baseball player
- January 28
  - Titus Adams, football player
  - Daniel Davison, musician and drummer, co-founder of Norma Jean
  - Brian Michael Smith, Actor
- January 29 – Max Goldblatt, actor, writer, and director
- January 30
  - Derek Bloom, drummer for From First to Last
  - Abram Boise, television personality
- January 31 – Elizabeth Armstrong, water polo player

=== February ===
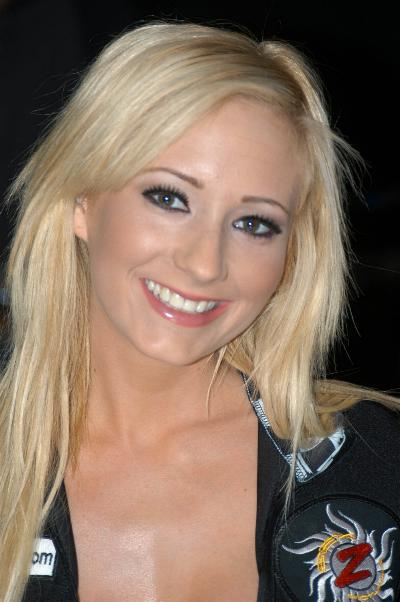
Hillary Scott

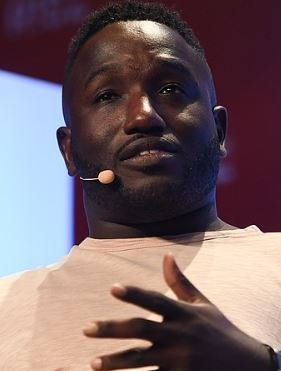
Hannibal Buress

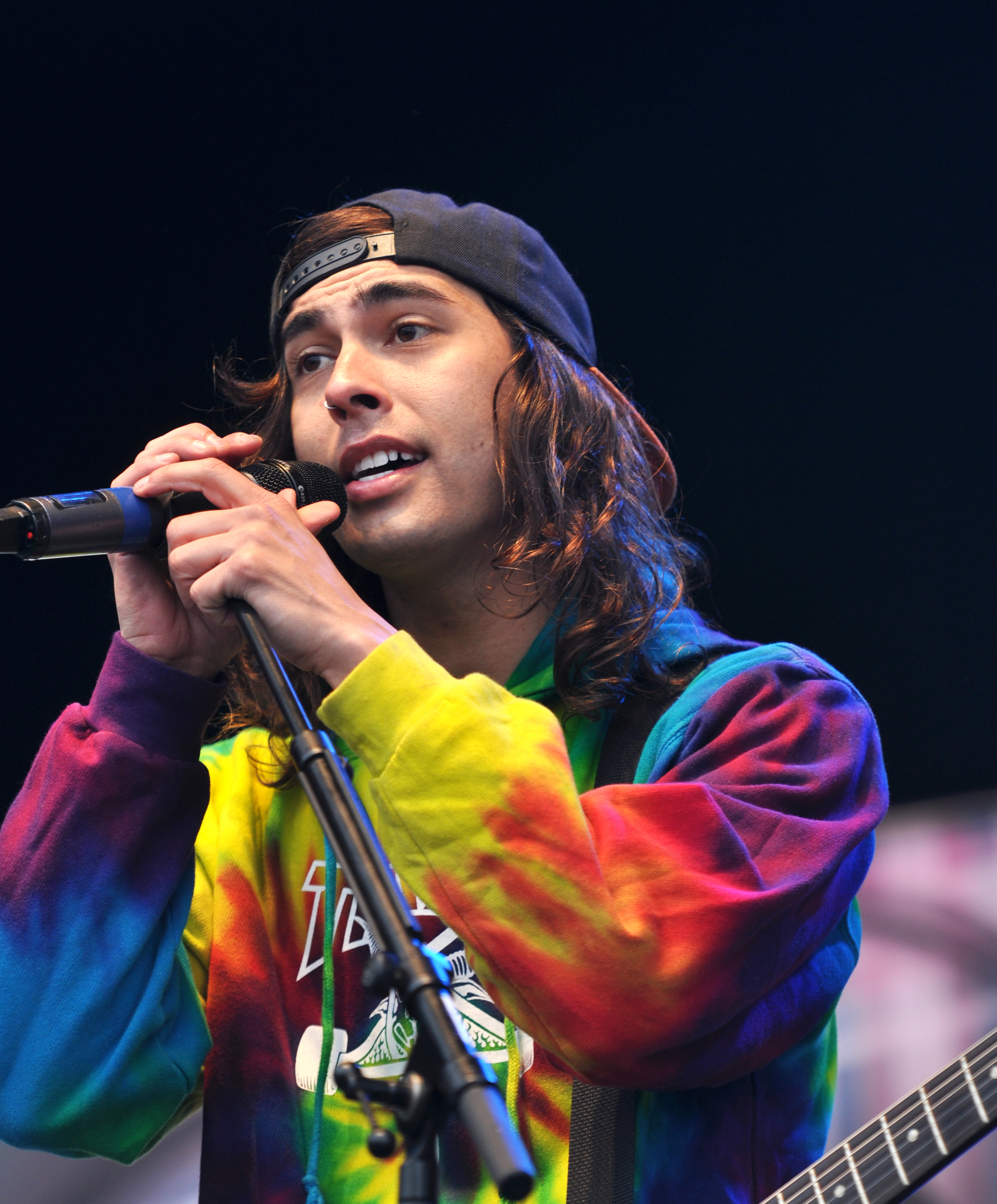
Vic Fuentes

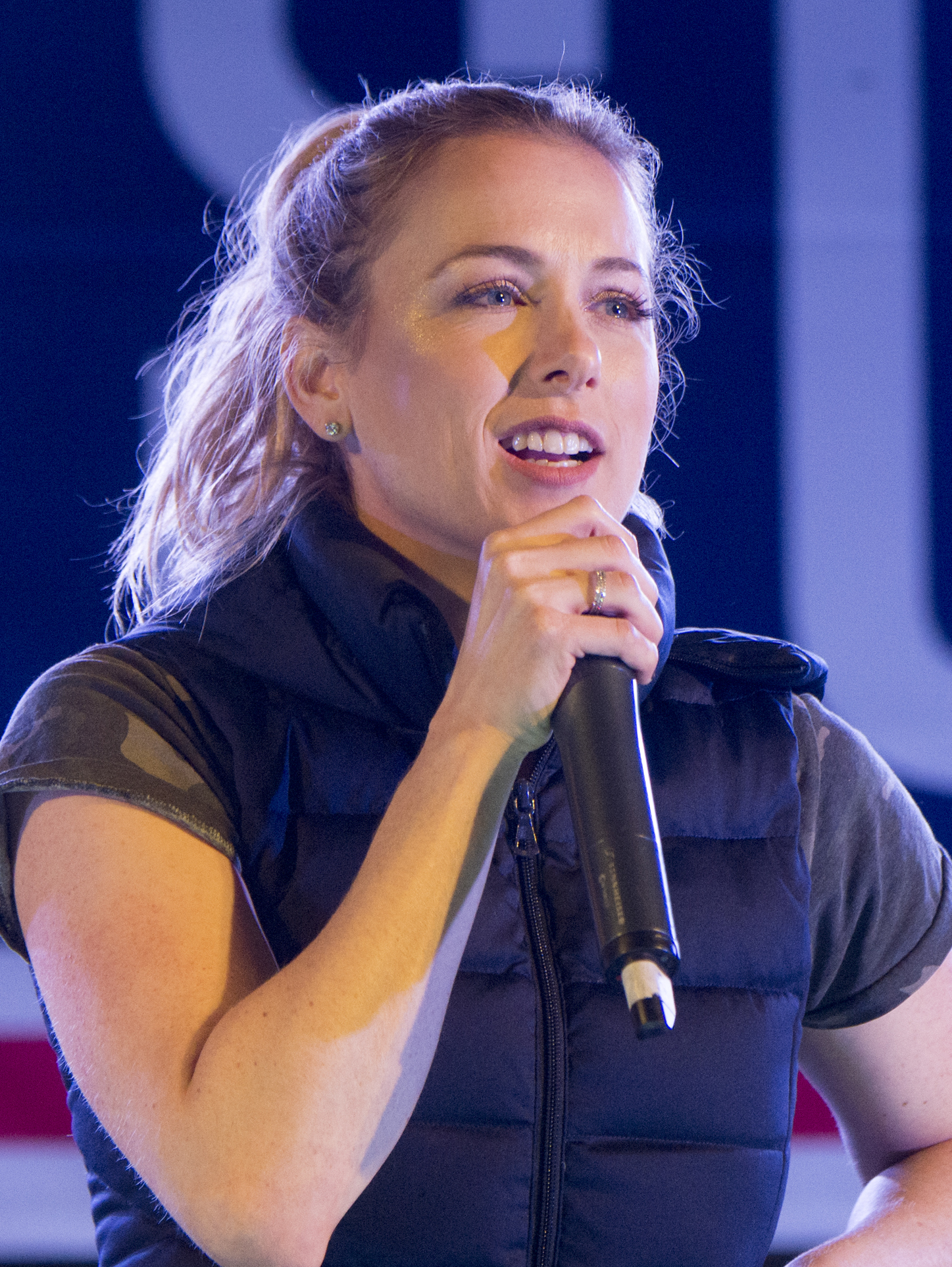
Iliza Shlesinger

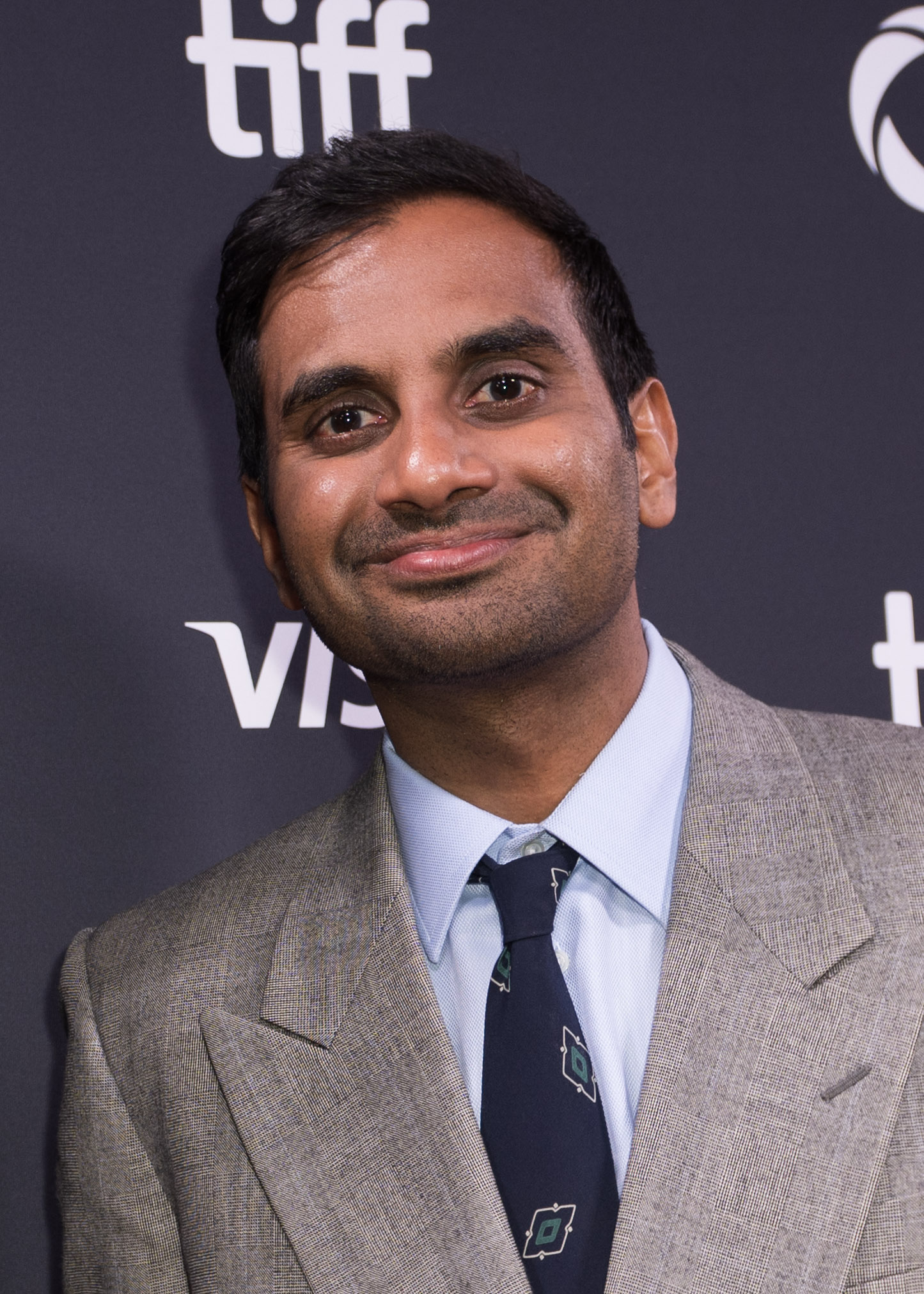
Aziz Ansari

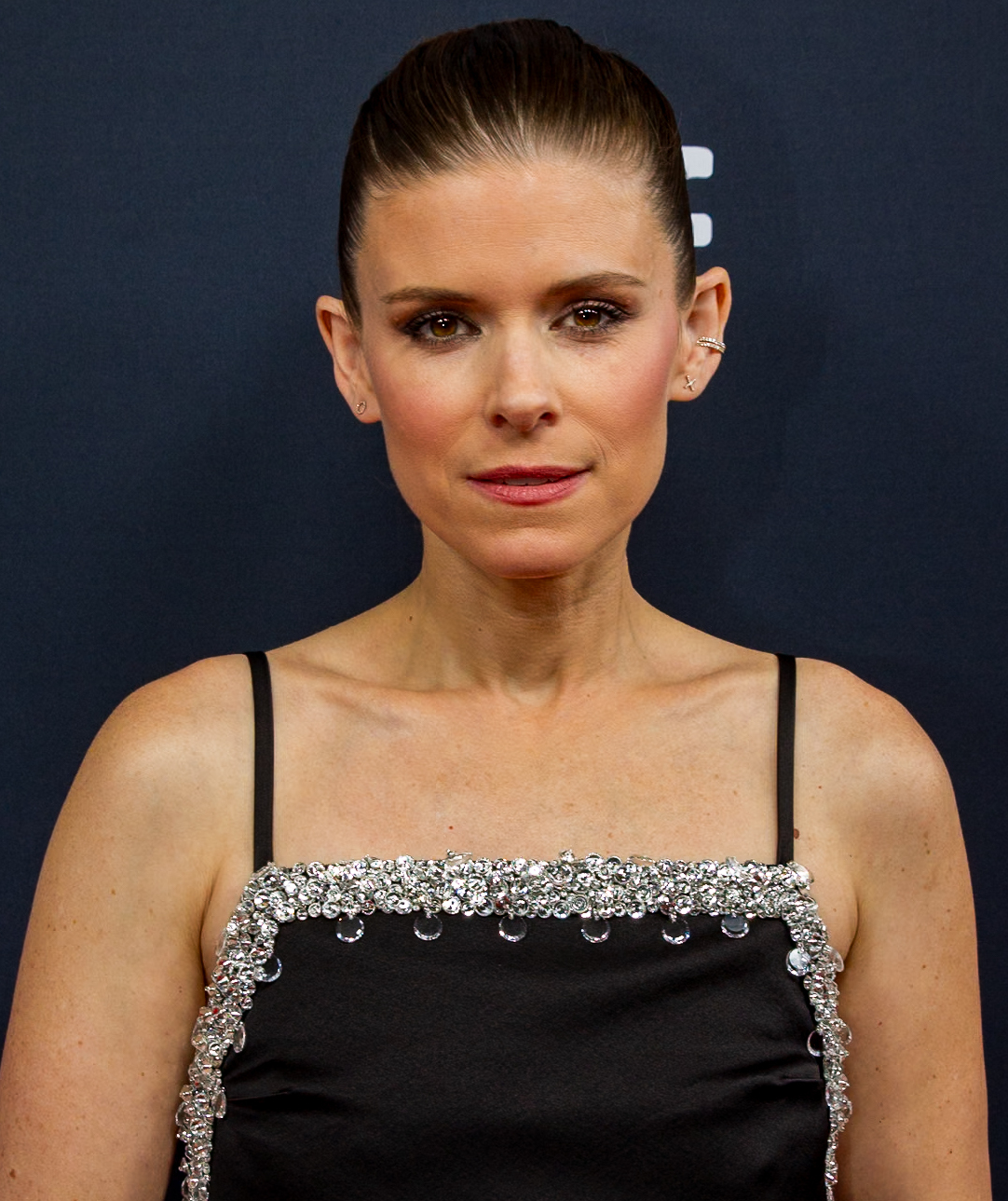
Kate Mara

- February 1
  - Ronnie Kroell, fashion model, actor, and singer
  - Andrew VanWyngarden, singer/songwriter and guitarist
- February 3
  - Richard Bartel, football player
  - Hillary Scott, pornographic actress
- February 4 – Hannibal Buress, comedian
- February 5
  - John Iadarola, left-wing pundit
  - Vanessa Rousso, poker player, attorney, DJ, and television personality
- February 6
  - Melrose Bickerstaff, financial advisor, fashion model, and fashion designer
  - Michael Robinson, football player
- February 7 – Scott Feldman, baseball player
- February 8
  - Burke Badenhop, baseball player
  - Jermaine Blackburn, basketball player
  - Jim Verraros, singer and actor
- February 9 – Matty Cardarople, actor and comedian
- February 10
  - Kenny Adeleke, Nigerian-born basketball player
  - Chad Bartlomé, soccer player
  - Vic Fuentes, singer/songwriter, guitarist, and frontman for Pierce the Veil
  - Kevin Matthews, pro wrestler
  - Joe Sempolinski, politician
- February 11 – Victor Adeyanju, football player
- February 13
  - Klayton Adams, football player and coach
  - Luke Barnett, actor, writer, and producer
- February 14 – Julia Ling, actress
- February 15
  - Nathan Ball, basketball player
  - Eddie Basden, basketball player
  - Elijah Behnke, politician
- February 16
  - John Magaro, actor
  - Charlet Chung, actress and voice actress
- February 17
  - Mark Arabo, human rights activist
  - Kevin Rudolf, singer/songwriter and record producer
- February 18
  - Troy Bienemann, football player
  - Jason Maxiell, basketball player
  - Wrenn Schmidt, actress
- February 19
  - Brad Kilby, baseball player
  - Ryan Whitney, hockey player
  - Jawad Williams, basketball player
- February 20
  - Kayla Bashore Smedley, field hockey player
  - Justin Verlander, baseball player
- February 21 – Wes Brisco, pro wrestler
- February 22
  - Ytai Abougzir, Israeli-born tennis player
  - Carlos Fisher, baseball player
  - Iliza Shlesinger, comedian
- February 23
  - Aziz Ansari, comedian and actor
  - Emily Blunt, actress and singer
- February 24 – Matt McGinley, drummer for Gym Class Heroes
- February 26 – Kara Monaco, model and television personality
- February 27
  - Taye Biddle, football player
  - Chaim Bloom, sports executive and Chief Baseball Officer for the Boston Red Sox
  - Devin Harris, basketball player
  - Kate Mara, actress
- February 28 – Linda Király, American-born Hungarian singer/songwriter

=== March ===
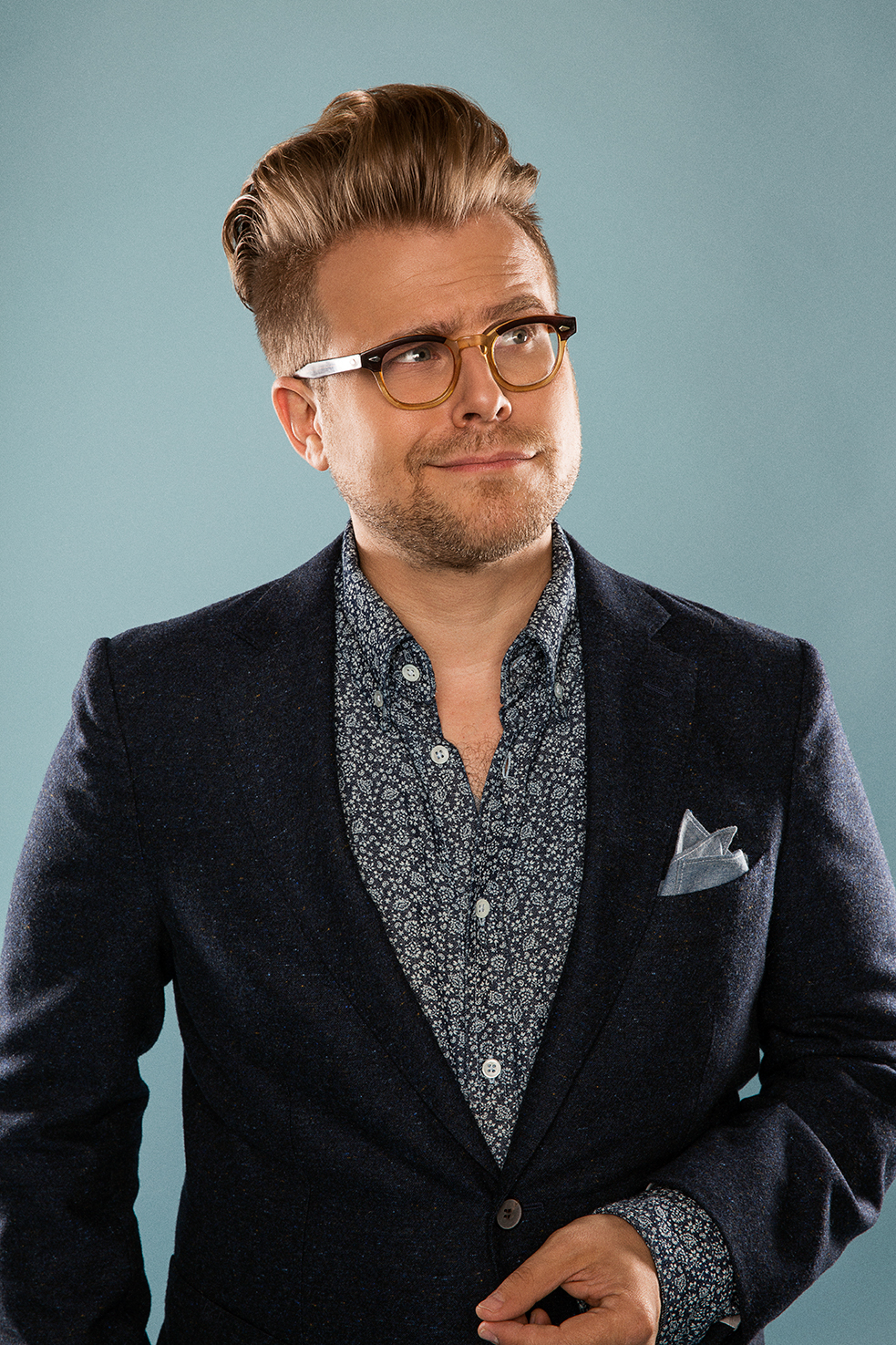
Adam Conover

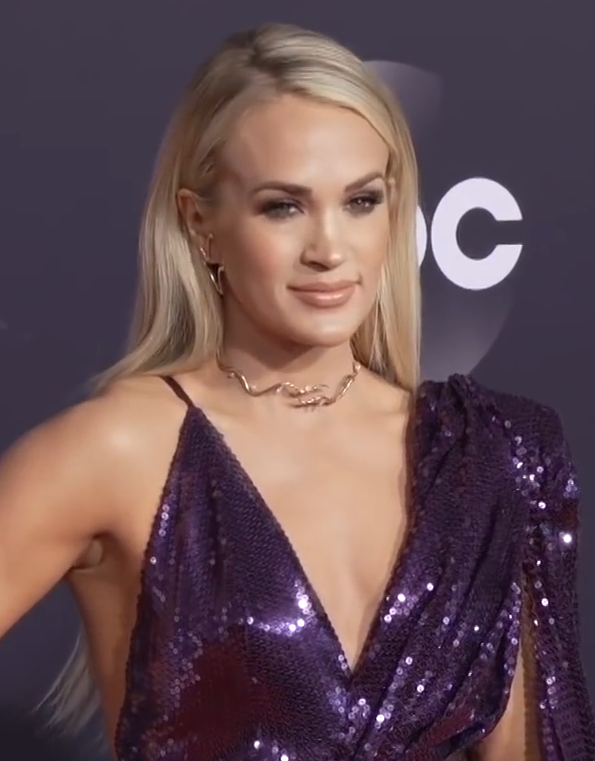
Carrie Underwood

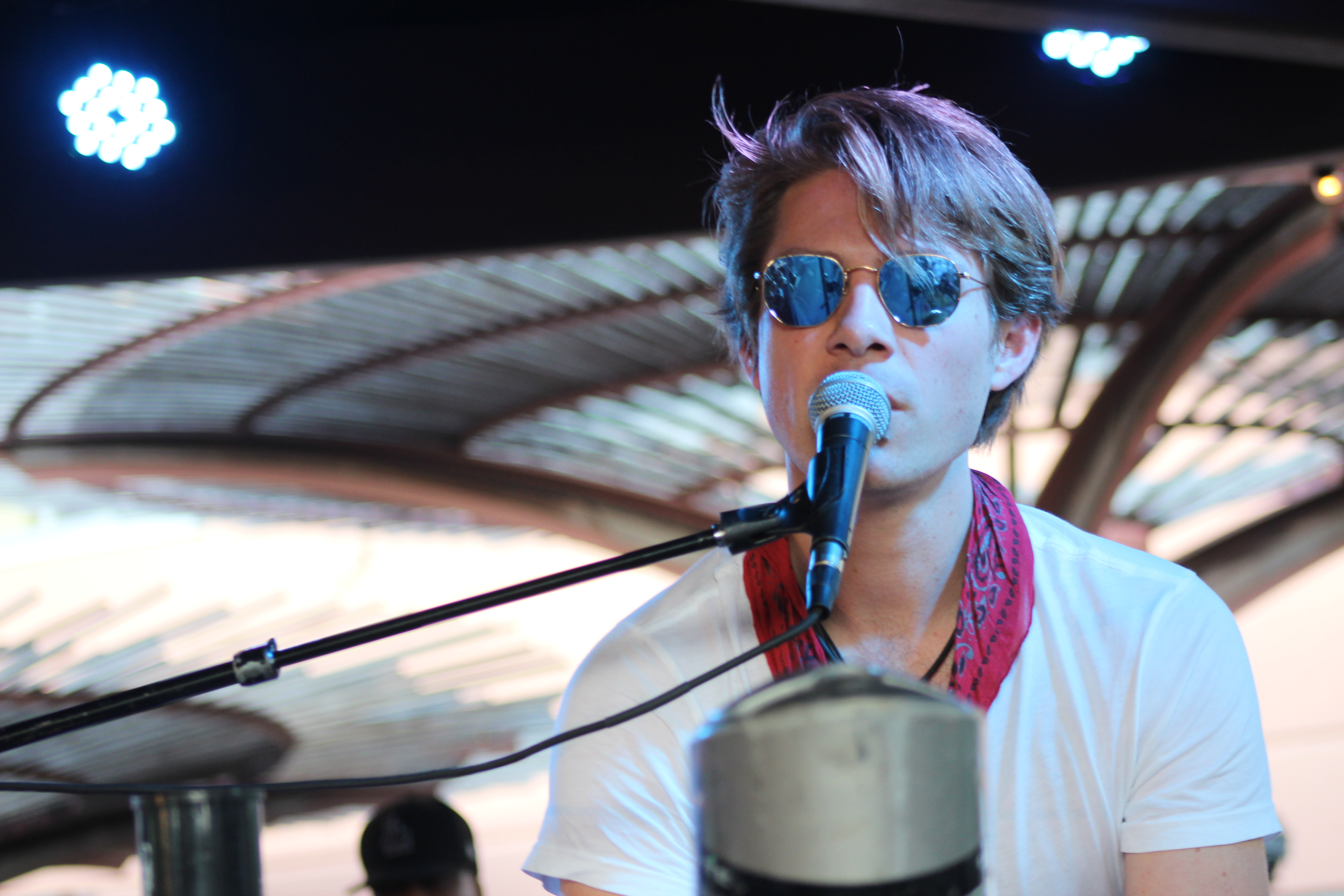
Taylor Hanson

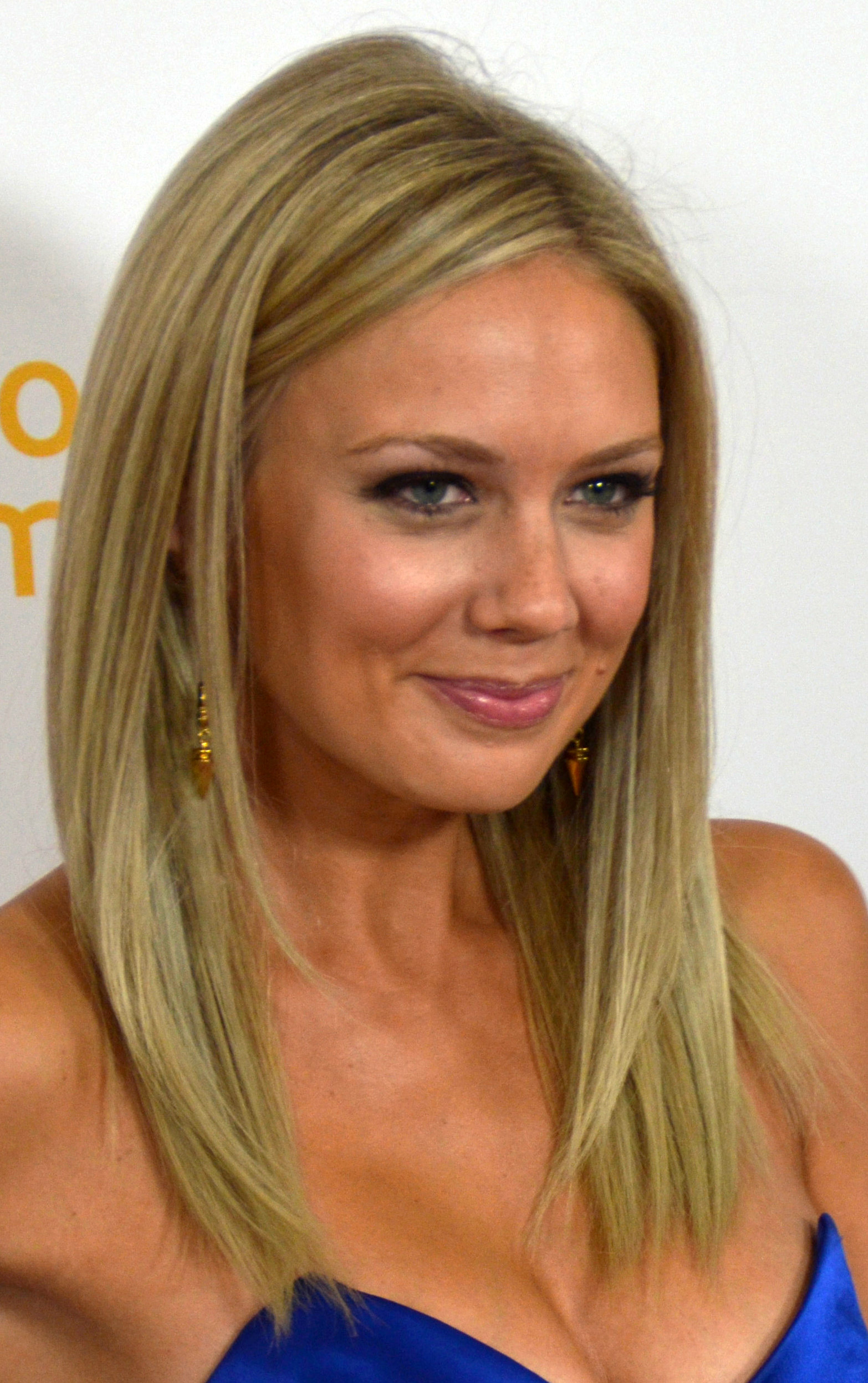
Melissa Ordway

- March 1
  - Sam Bishop, soccer player
  - Molly Engstrom, ice hockey player and coach
- March 2 – Adam Conover, comedian, writer, voice actor, and television host
- March 3 – Brent Almond, producer
- March 4 – Jessica Heap, actress
- March 5
  - Tiphany Adams, reality television personality, actress, model, and speaker
  - Marvin Allen, English-born football player
  - Torben Bernhard, filmmaker and rap artist
- March 6 – Mike McDaniel, football coach
- March 7
  - Raquel Alessi, actress
  - Steven B. Grant, politician
  - Taylor Tankersley, baseball player
- March 9
  - Bobby Campo, actor
  - Clint Dempsey, soccer player
  - Victor Gojcaj, actor
- March 10
  - Janet Mock, author and activist
  - Carrie Underwood, country singer
- March 11 – Melissa Rycroft, television personality and reality television contestant
- March 12
  - Todd Bates, football player and coach
  - Ron Funches, actor, comedian, and writer
- March 14 – Taylor Hanson, singer and keyboard player
- March 15 – Peter Atencio, director
- March 16
  - Kevin Bookout, basketball player
  - Jon-Michael Ecker, actor
  - Stephanie Gatschet, actress
- March 17
  - Atit Shah, producer
  - Timothy Thatcher, wrestler
- March 18
  - Bradley Bell, keyboardist for Chiodos
  - Ethan Carter III, wrestler
  - Kyle Downes, actor
  - Brendan Schaub, mixed martial artist
- March 19
  - Matt McJunkins, bassist and vocalist for A Perfect Circle
  - Nicole Muirbrook, actress and model
  - Matt Sydal, wrestler
  - Zac Woodfin, football player and coach
- March 20
  - Patrick Afif, football player
  - Michael Cassidy, actor
  - Mikal Mahdi, convicted spree killer (d. 2025)
- March 21 – Clint Ingram, football player
- March 23 – Patrick Beilein, basketball player and coach
- March 27 – Shawntinice Polk, basketball player (d. 2005)
- March 29
  - Anthony Armstrong, football player
  - Donald Cerrone, mixed martial artist
  - Chokwe Antar Lumumba, politician, mayor of Jackson, Mississippi (2017–present)
  - Tom McNamara, politician, mayor of Rockford, Illinois (2017–present)
  - Matt Van Epps, politician
- March 30
  - Annie Bersagel, long-distance runner and lawyer
  - Zach Gowen, wrestler
  - Patrick Murphy, politician
- March 31 – Melissa Ordway, actress and model

=== April ===
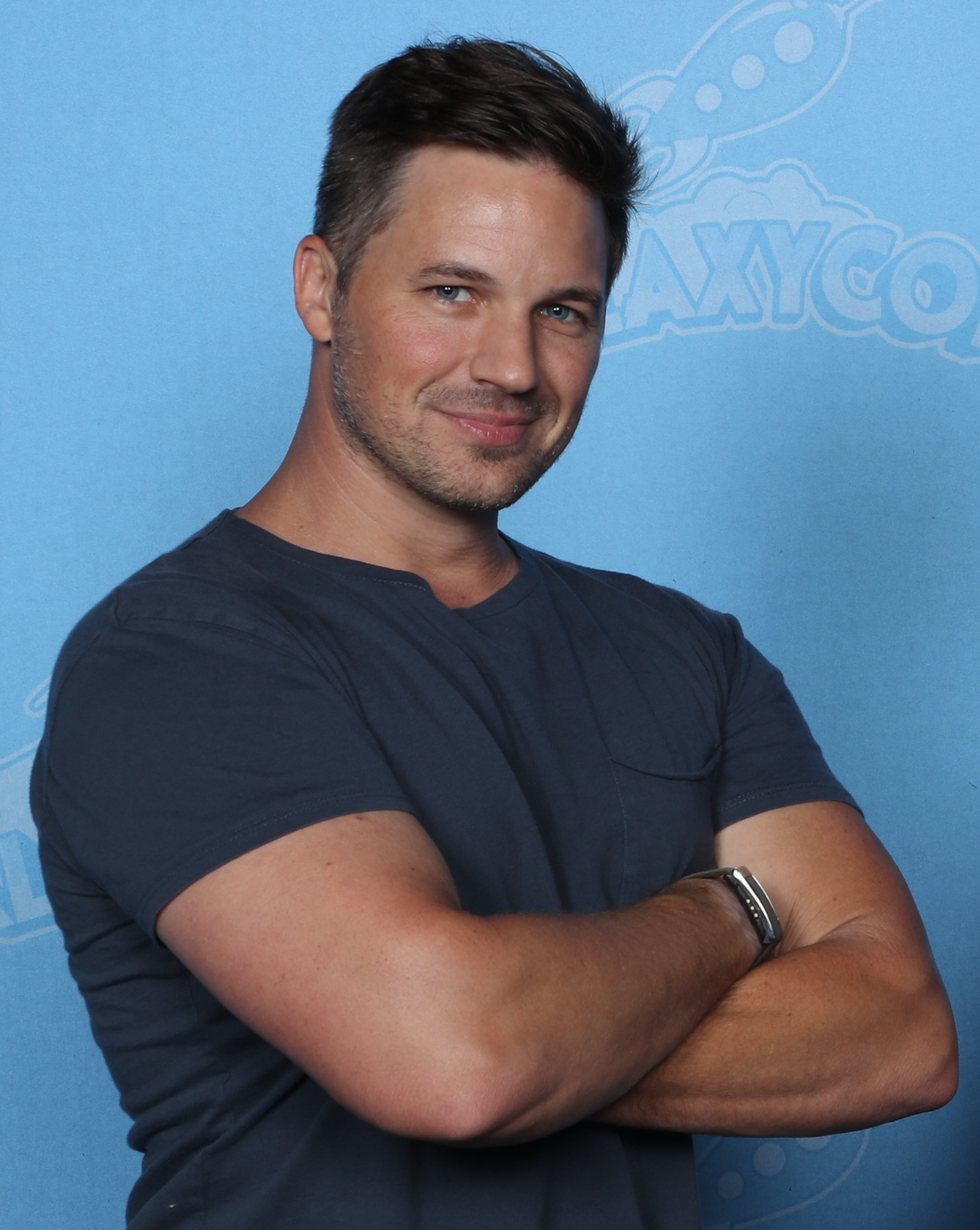
Matt Lanter

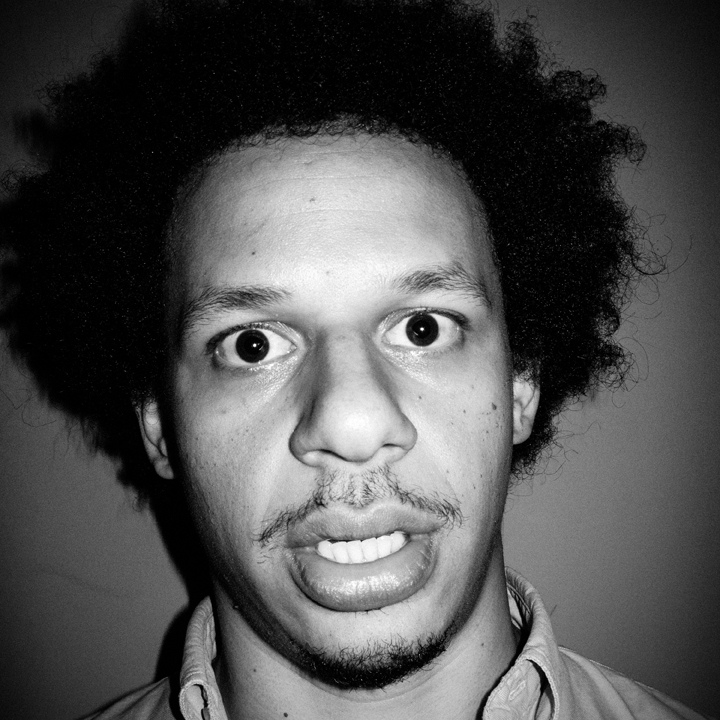
Eric Andre

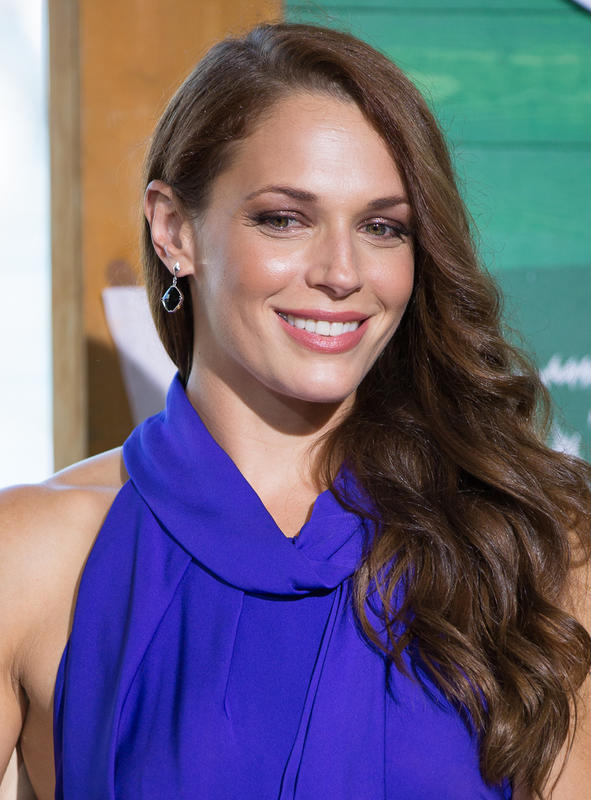
Amanda Righetti

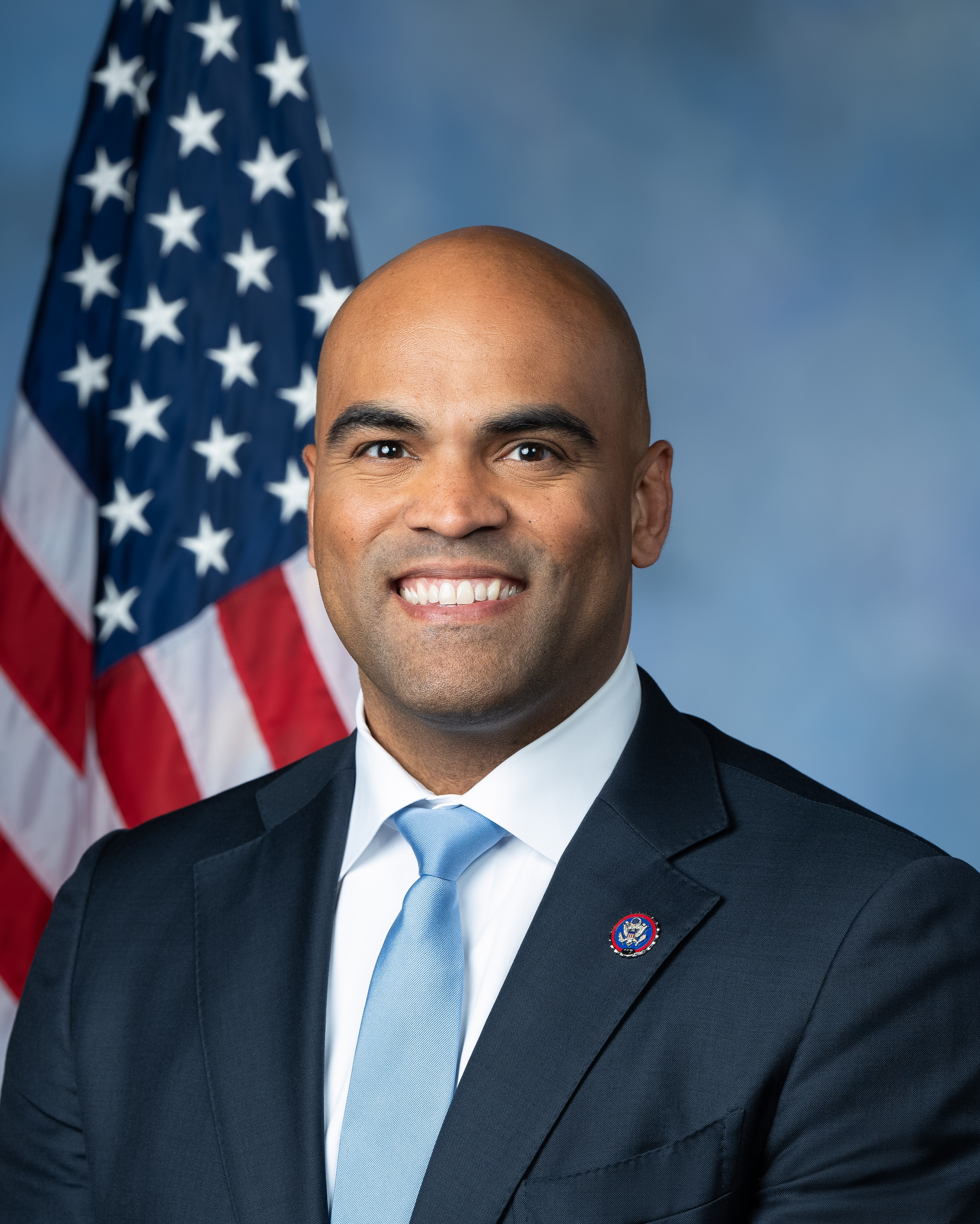
Colin Allred

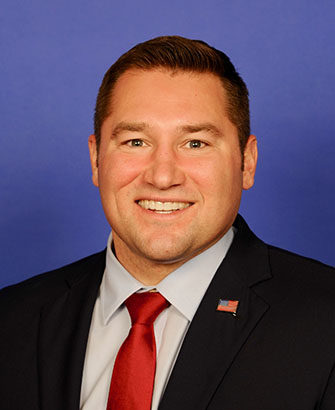
Guy Reschenthaler

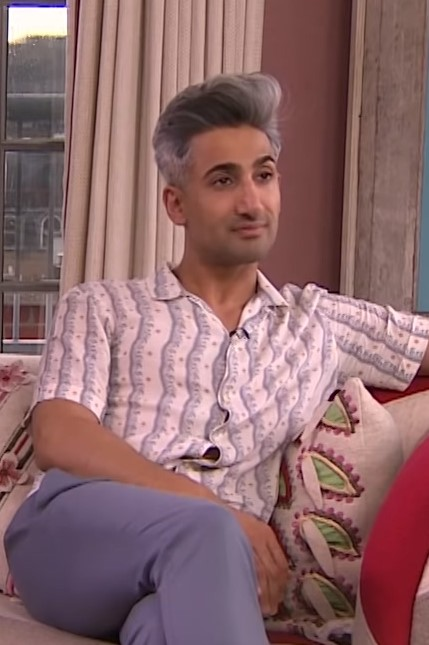
Tan France

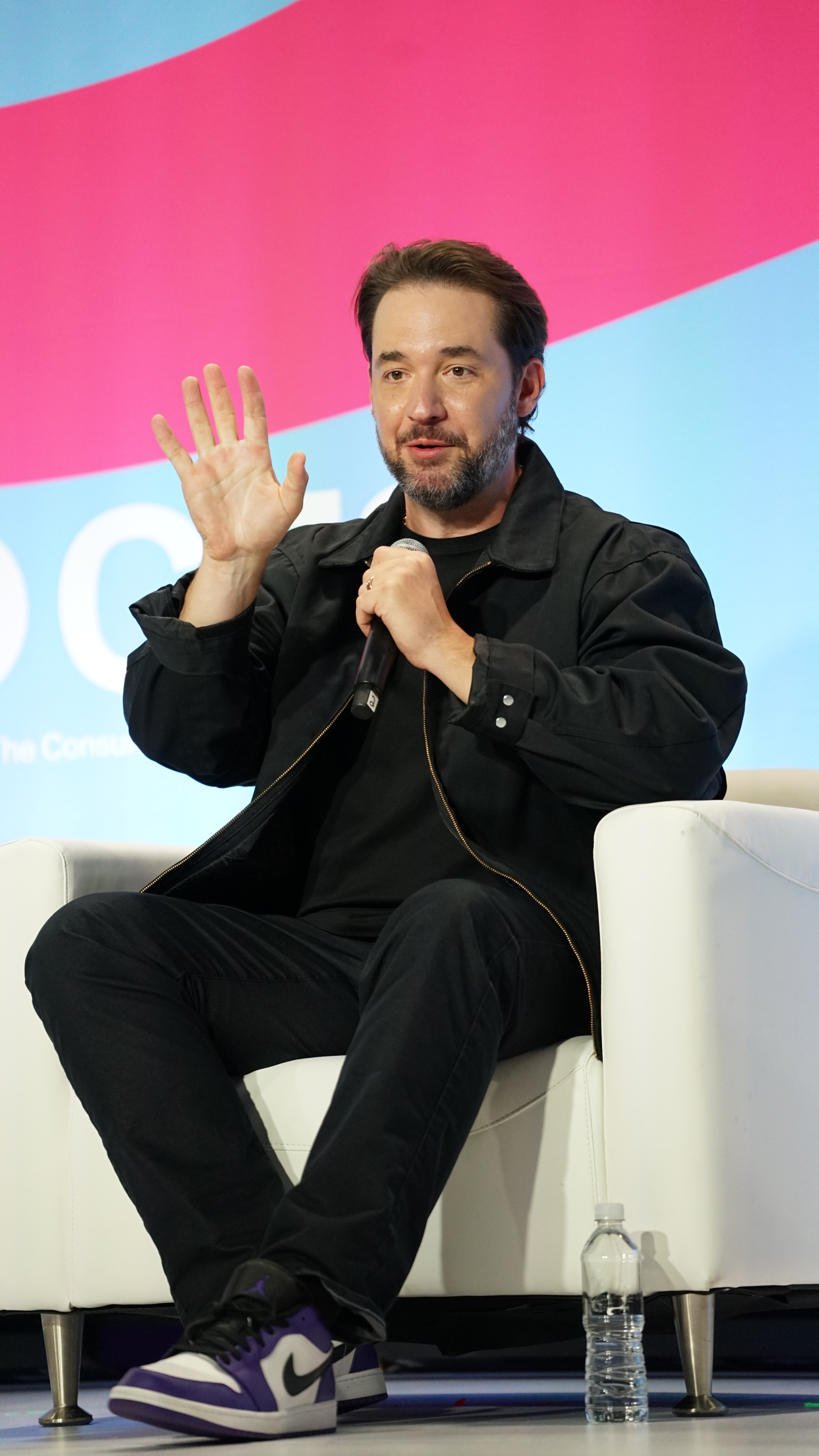
Alexis Ohanian

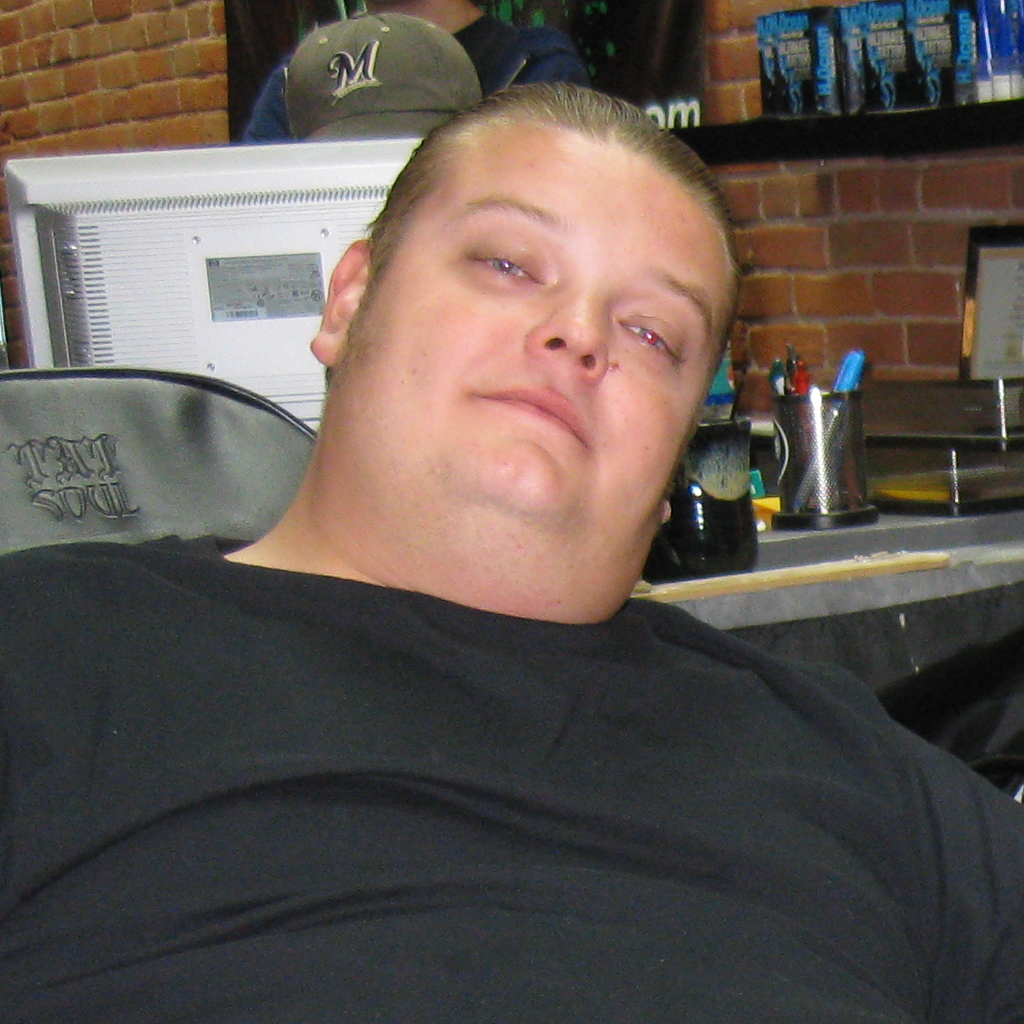
Corey Harrison

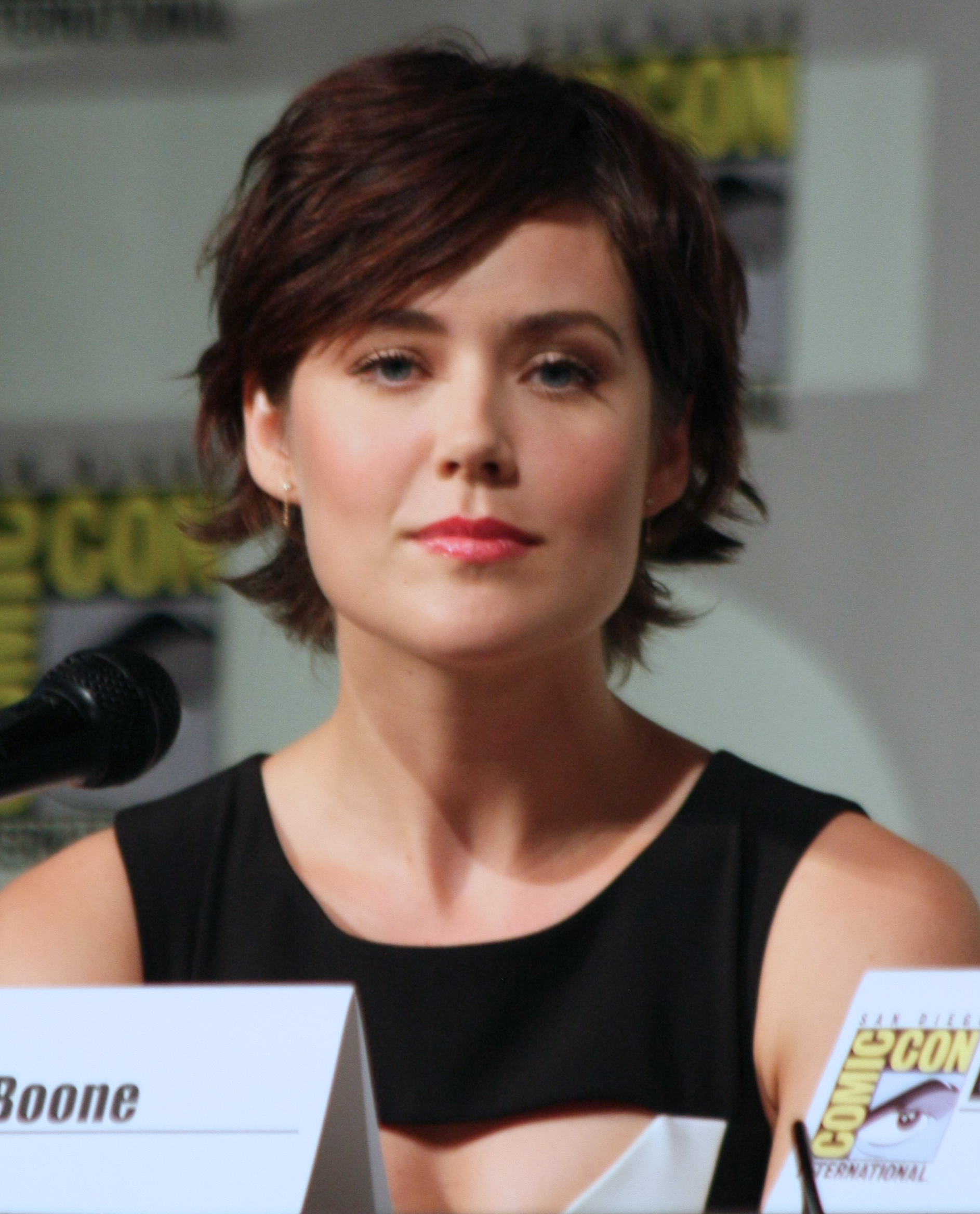
Megan Boone

- April 1
  - Jacob Appelbaum, journalist, computer security researcher, artist, and hacker
  - Matt Lanter, actor and model
  - Sean Taylor, football player (d. 2007)
- April 2 – Karlous Miller, comedian
- April 3 – Errol Barnett, British-born news anchor and journalist
- April 4
  - Eric André, comedian, actor, and television host
  - Charles Bennett, football player
  - Amanda Righetti, actress
- April 5 – Phil Bolton, rugby player
- April 6
  - Artosis, esports commentator and Twitch streamer
  - Diora Baird, actress
  - Jeremy Bolm, singer and frontman for Touché Amoré
  - Bobbi Starr, pornographic actress
- April 7 – Veronica Alvarez, baseball player
- April 8 – Levy Tran, actress and model
- April 9
  - Devin Barclay, football player
  - Donovan Richards, politician
- April 10
  - Gabriel Arana, journalist
  - Janelle Asselin, comic book editor and writer
  - Sherman Austin, anarchist and musician
  - Jamie Chung, actress and reality star
  - Ryan Merriman, actor
- April 12
  - Rufus Alexander, football player
  - Judy Marte, actress and producer
- April 13 – Jay Bezel, rapper
- April 14
  - Jon Bernad, artist and producer
  - Jeff Fiorentino, baseball player
- April 15
  - Colin Allred, politician and football player
  - Blu, rapper and record producer
- April 17 – Guy Reschenthaler, politician
- April 18
  - Jordan Beck, football player
  - Reeve Carney, actor and singer/songwriter
- April 19 – Joe Mauer, baseball player
- April 20
  - Jason Avant, football player
  - Alison Bartosik, Olympic swimmer
  - Benjah, songwriter and producer
  - Tan France, English-born fashion designer, entrepreneur, and television personality
- April 21
  - Dario Hunter, rabbi, lawyer and politician
  - Tarvaris Jackson, football player
  - Brigid Kelly, politician (d. 2024)
- April 22
  - Remi Ayodele, football player
  - Francis Capra, actor
  - Matt Jones, football player
- April 23
  - Mike Bell, football player
  - Carl Higbie, Navy SEAL, author, and political commentator
  - Aaron Hill, actor
- April 24
  - Madeline Ashby, American-born Canadian science fiction writer
  - Daniel Barone, baseball player
  - Will Champlin, singer/songwriter
  - Alexis Ohanian, internet entrepreneur, investor, and co-founder of Reddit
- April 26 – Adam Gregg, politician, 47th Lieutenant Governor of Iowa
- April 27
  - Corey Harrison, businessman and reality star
  - Greg Miller, media personality
- April 28
  - Emily Azevedo, bobsledder
  - Julia Bachison, beauty pageant titleholder
  - Sam Jones III, actor
- April 29
  - Megan Boone, actress
  - Jay Cutler, football player
  - Sam Jones III, actor
  - David Lee, basketball player
- April 30 – Stevie Aiello, songwriter, musician, and record producer

=== May ===
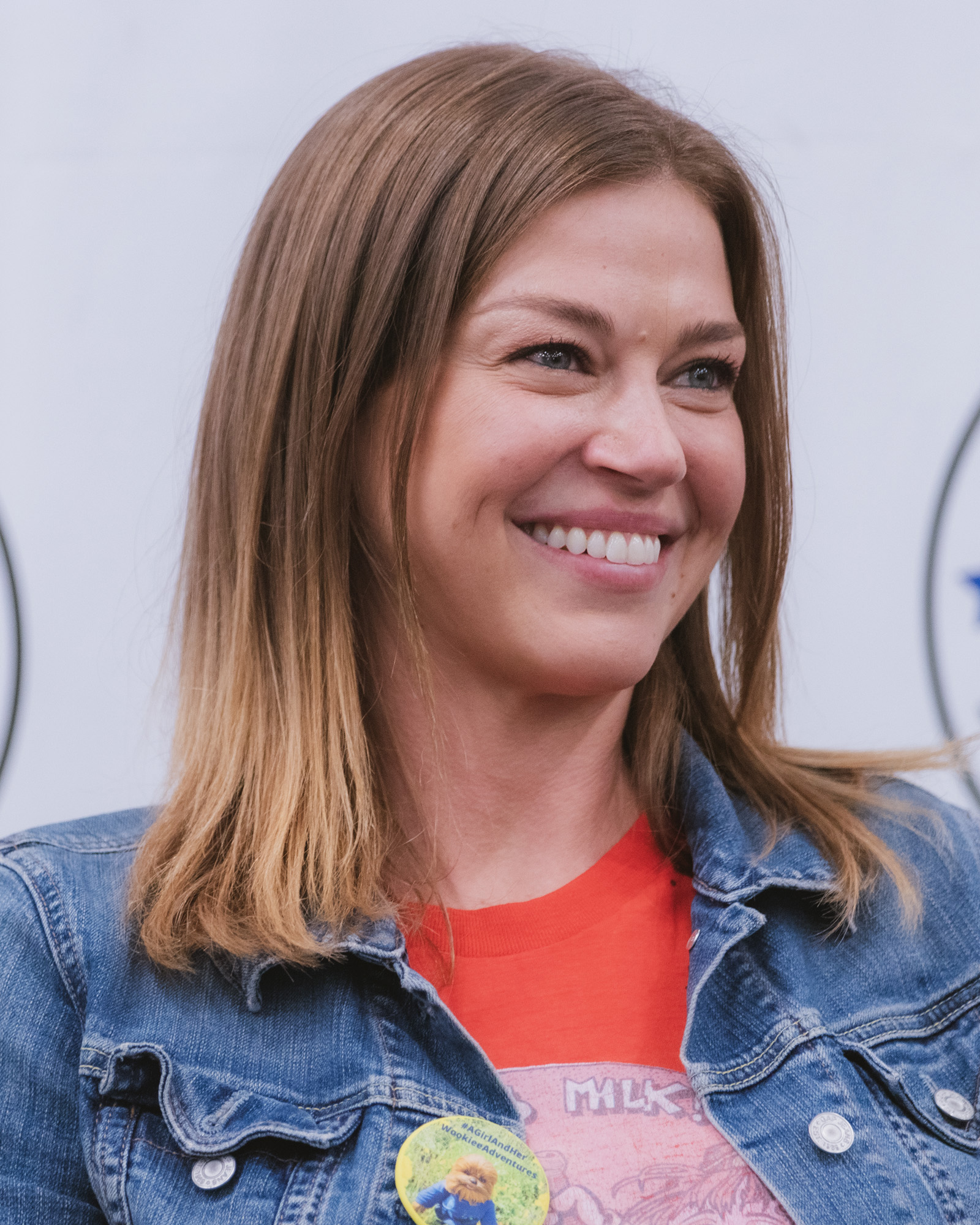
Adrianne Palicki

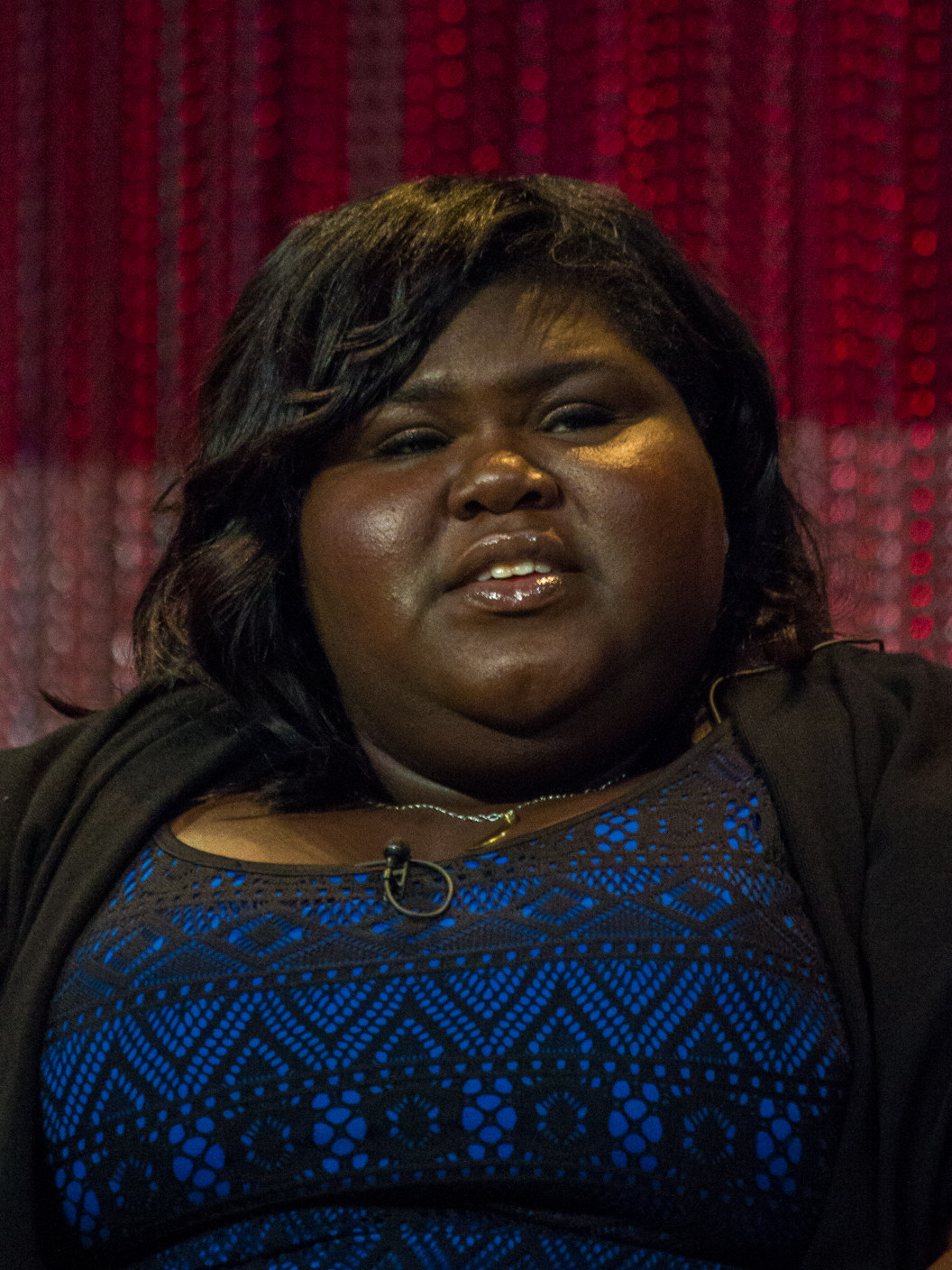
Gabourey Sidibe

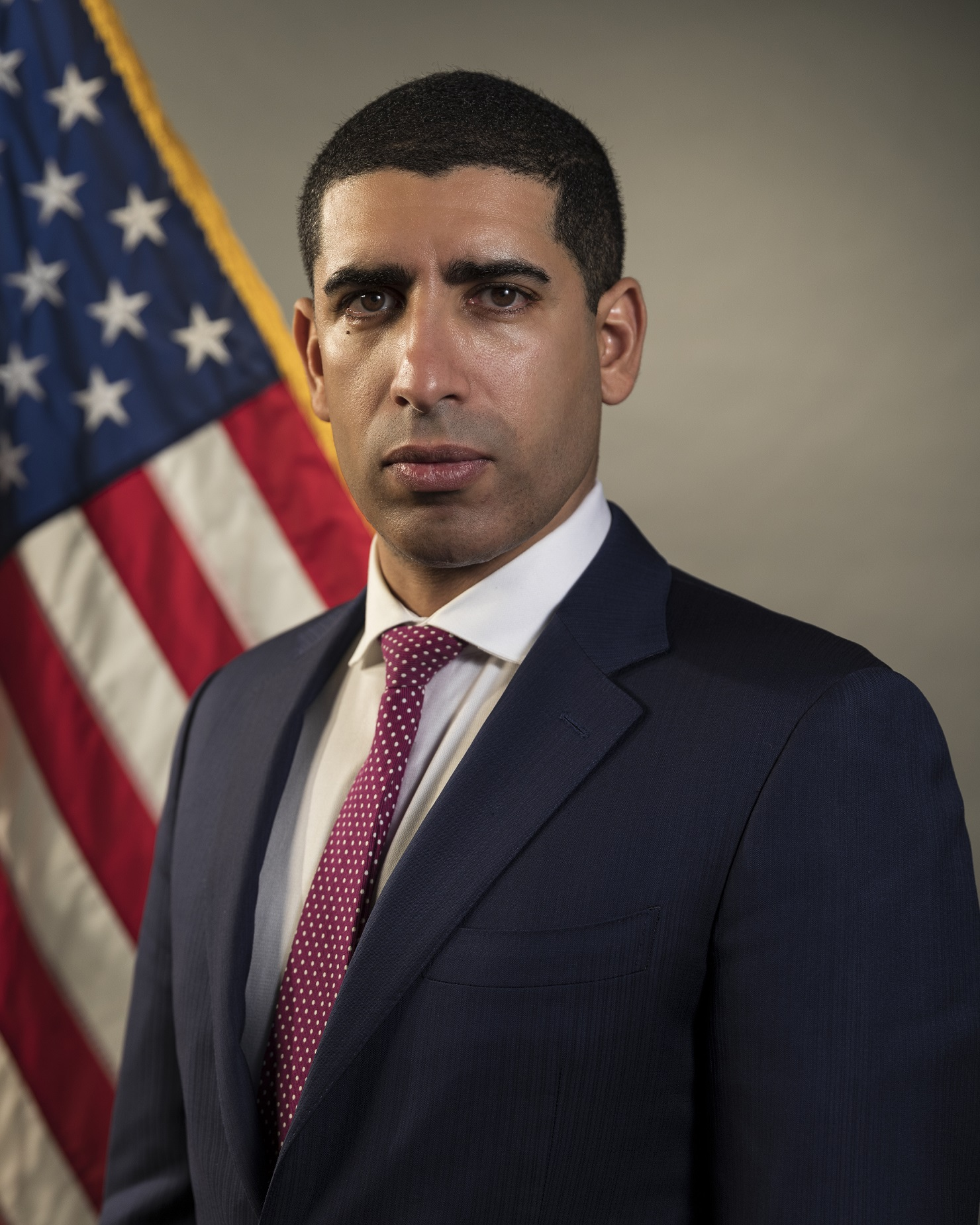
Florent Groberg

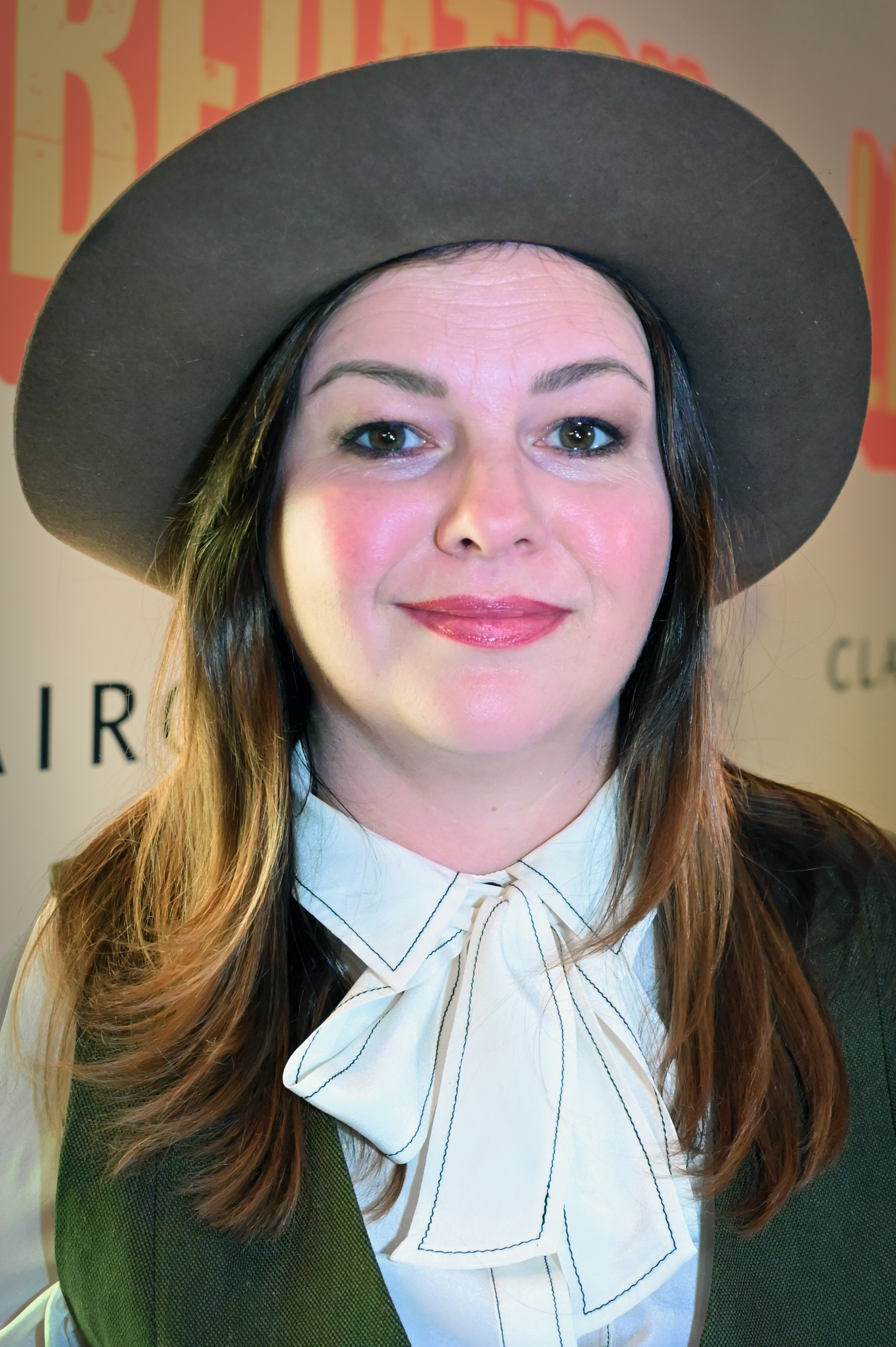
Amber Tamblyn

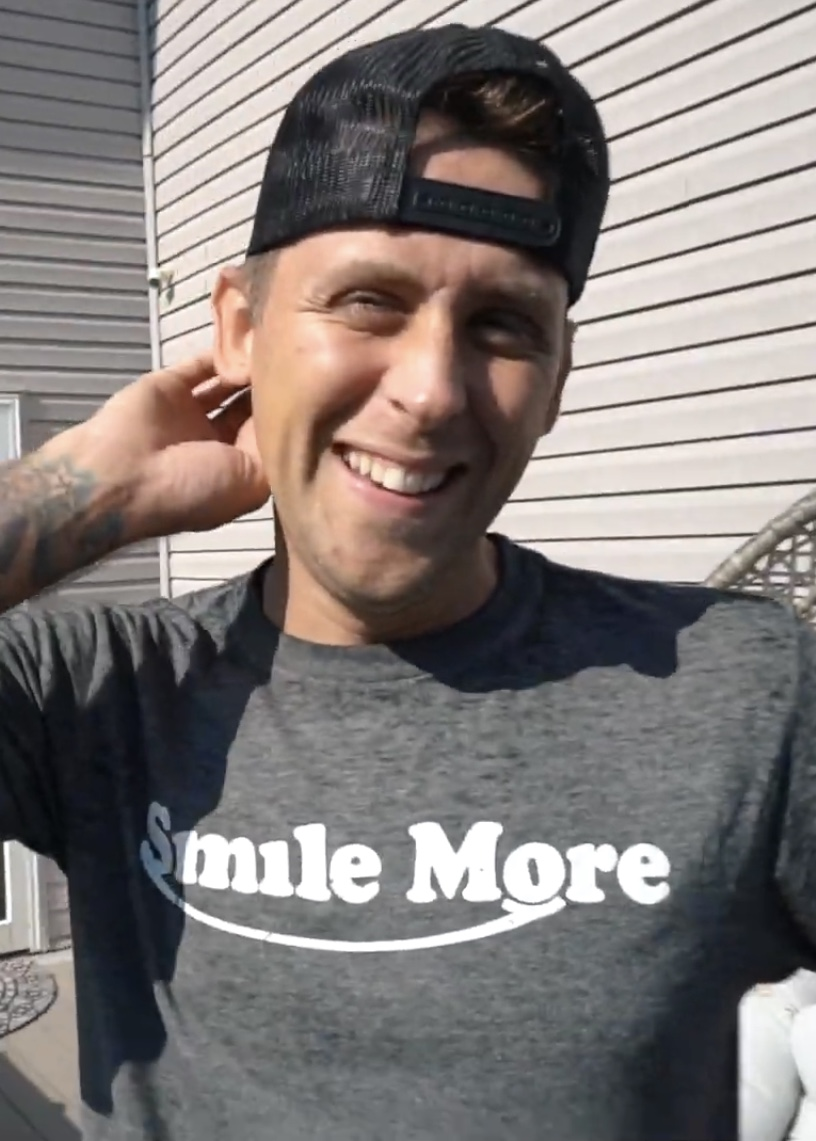
Roman Atwood

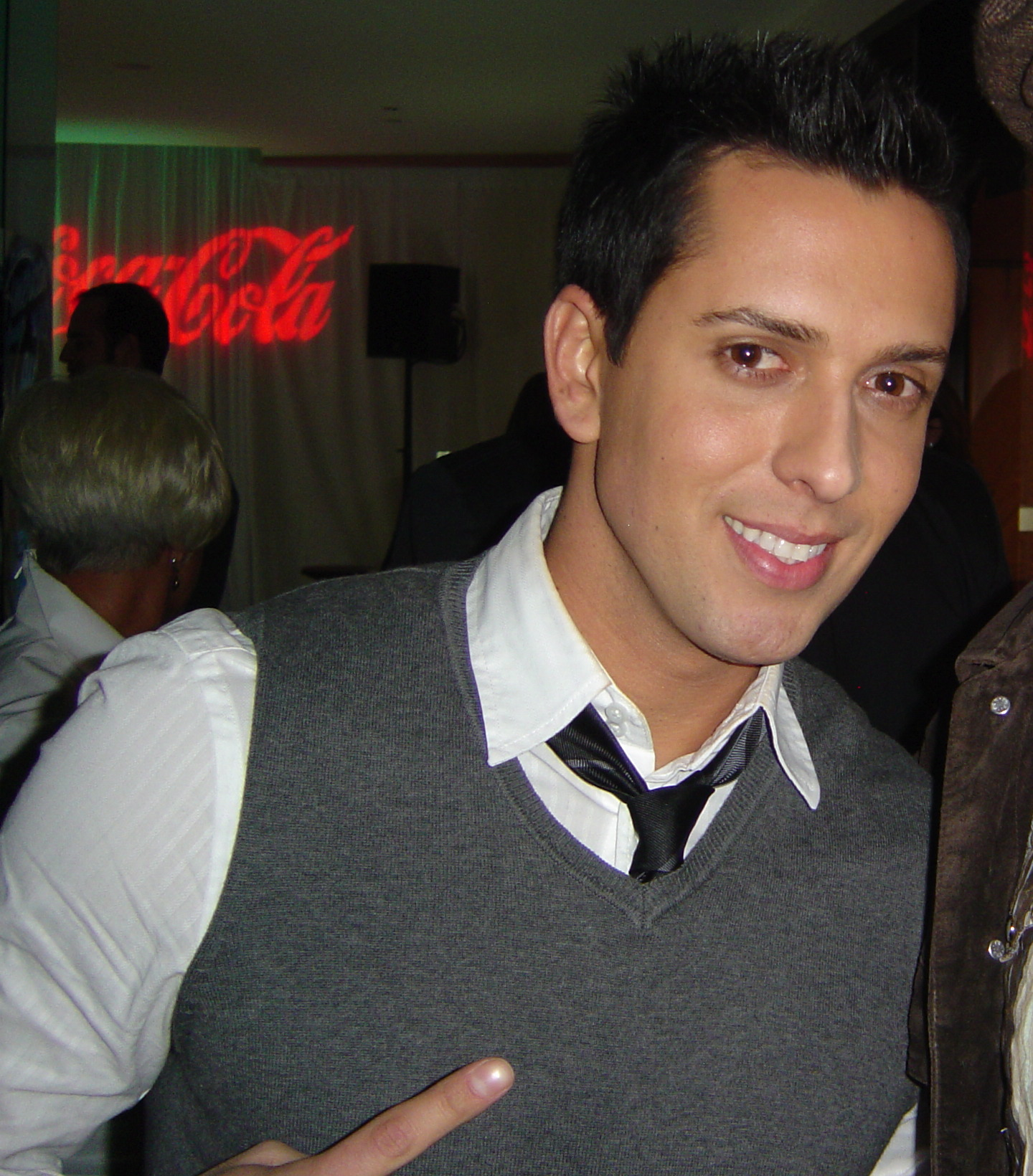
David Hernandez

- May 1 – Human Tornado, wrestler
- May 2 – Gaius Charles, actor
- May 3
  - Joseph Addai, football player
  - Brian Alexander, water polo player
  - Ari Magder, actor (d. 2012)
- May 4 – Brad Bufanda, actor (d. 2017)
- May 6
  - Seyi Abolaji, Nigerian-born soccer player
  - Reid W. Barton, mathematician
  - Adrianne Palicki, actress
  - Doron Perkins, basketball player
  - Gabourey Sidibe, actress
- May 8 – Florent Groberg, French-born U.S. Army veteran in the Afghan War and Medal of Honor recipient
- May 9
  - Tyler Lumsden, baseball player
  - Antonio Reynoso politician
- May 10
  - Chad Barefoot, politician
  - Zac Taylor, football player and coach
- May 11
  - Matt Baker, football player and coach
  - Brett Basanez, football player
  - Daizee Haze, wrestler
  - Shannon M. Kent, United States Navy Senior Chief Petty Officer and cryptologic technician, killed in the 2019 Manbij bombing (d. 2019)
  - Matt Leinart, football player
- May 12 – Brett Wiesner, soccer player (d. 2014)
- May 13 – Tim Brennan, guitarist for Dropkick Murphys
- May 14 – Amber Tamblyn, actress
- May 15
  - The Kid Mero, media personality
  - Tom Lawlor, wrestler and podcaster
  - Joseph Pepper, guitarist for Cartel
  - Clint Sammons, baseball player
  - Michael Schlossberg, politician
- May 17
  - Jayson Blair, actor
  - Channing Frye, basketball player
  - Ginger Gonzaga, actress
- May 18 – Michael Behenna, U.S. Army Lieutenant
- May 19 – Adam Schindler, mixed martial artist
- May 20 – Michaela McManus, actress
- May 21 – Leva Bates, wrestler
- May 22
  - John Hopkins, MotoGP racer
  - Jordan Mancino, drummer for As I Lay Dying and Wovenwar
- May 23
  - Josh Pace, basketball player
  - Alex Shelley, wrestler
- May 26
  - Mark Anderson, football player
  - Pat Grassley, politician
- May 27 – Bobby Convey, soccer player
- May 28
  - Active Child, singer/songwriter and record producer
  - Jay Alford, football player
  - Roman Atwood, YouTuber and prankster
  - Megalyn Echikunwoke, actress
  - Aaron Rosa, mixed martial artist
  - Cory Wade, baseball player
- May 29 – Will Putney, record producer and musician
- May 30
  - Dana Linn Bailey, bodybuilder
  - Duane Bastress, mixed martial artist
  - Darryl Blackstock, football player
- May 31
  - Lorenzo Alexander, football player
  - David Hernandez, singer
  - Michael Lynche, singer

=== June ===
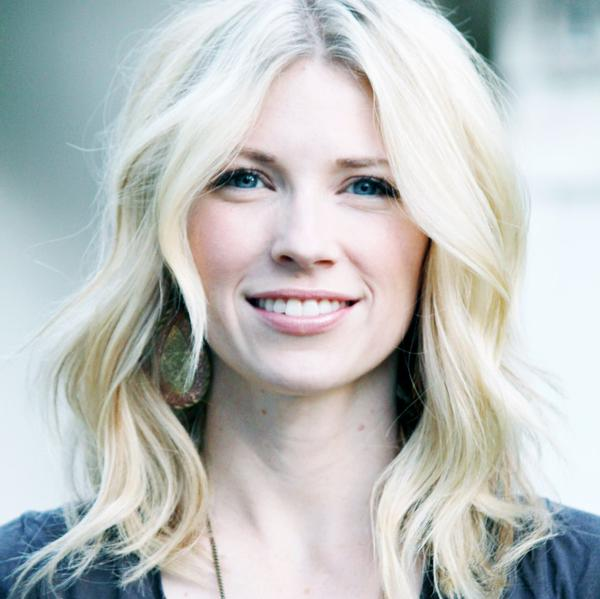
Brooke White

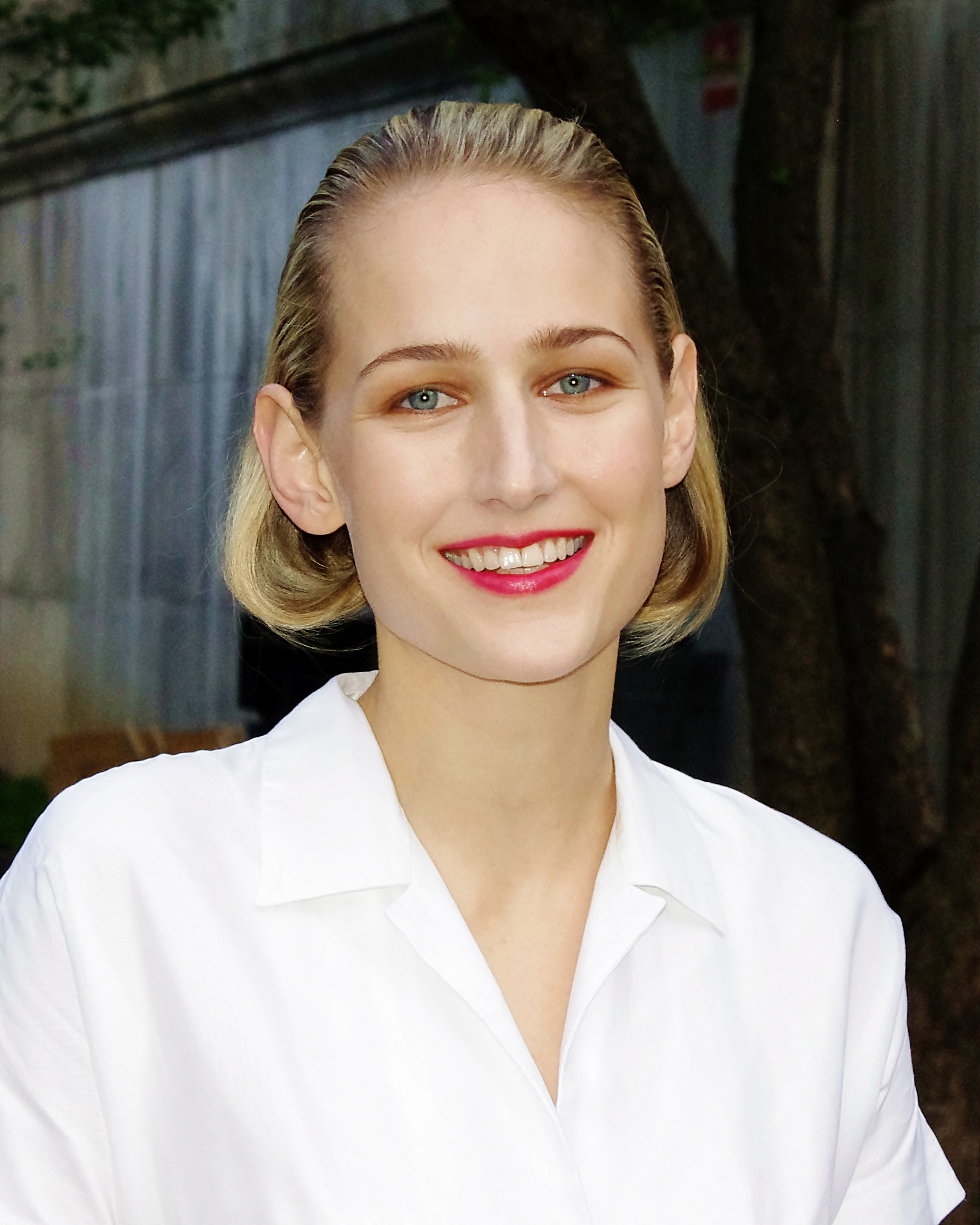
Leelee Sobieski

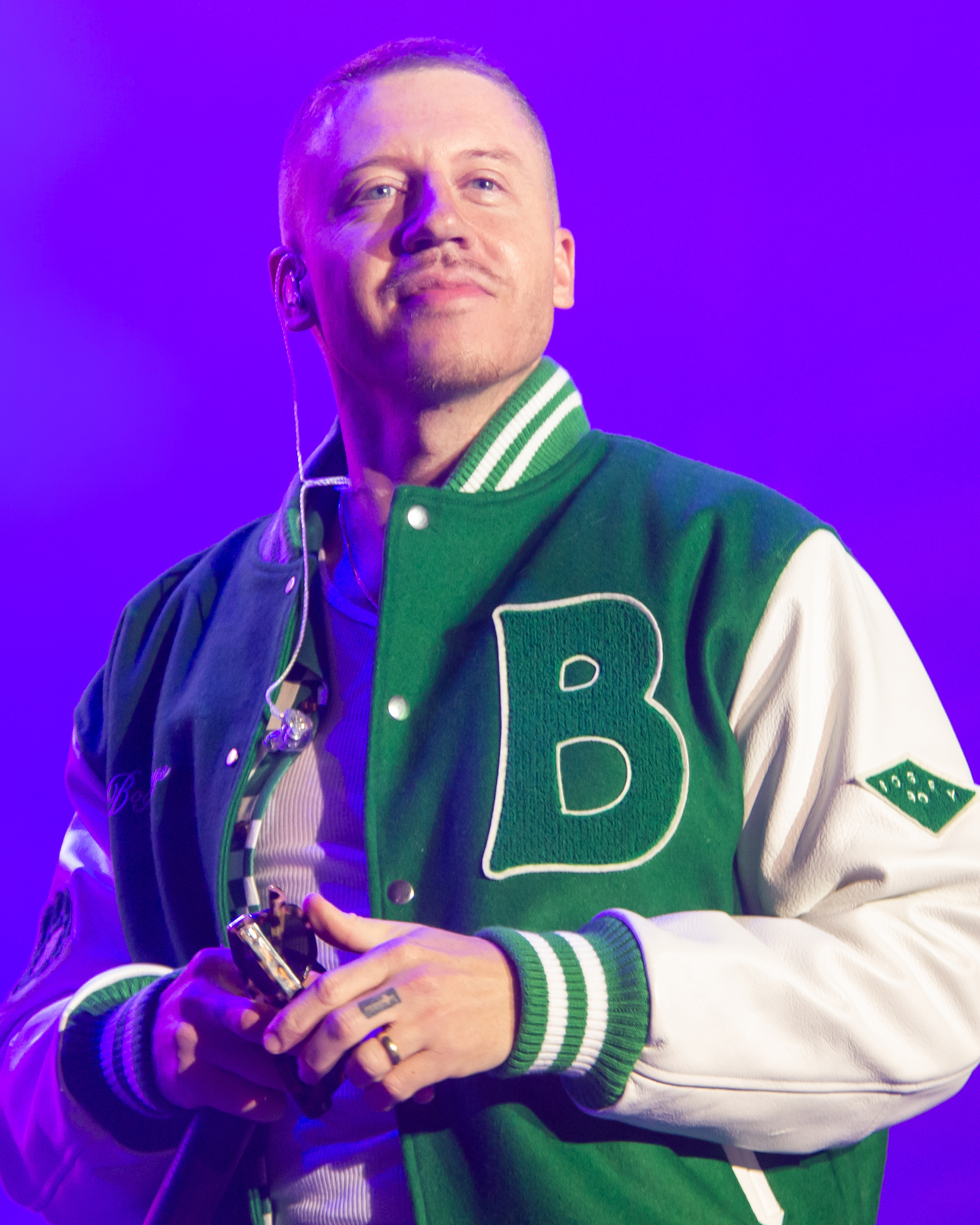
Macklemore

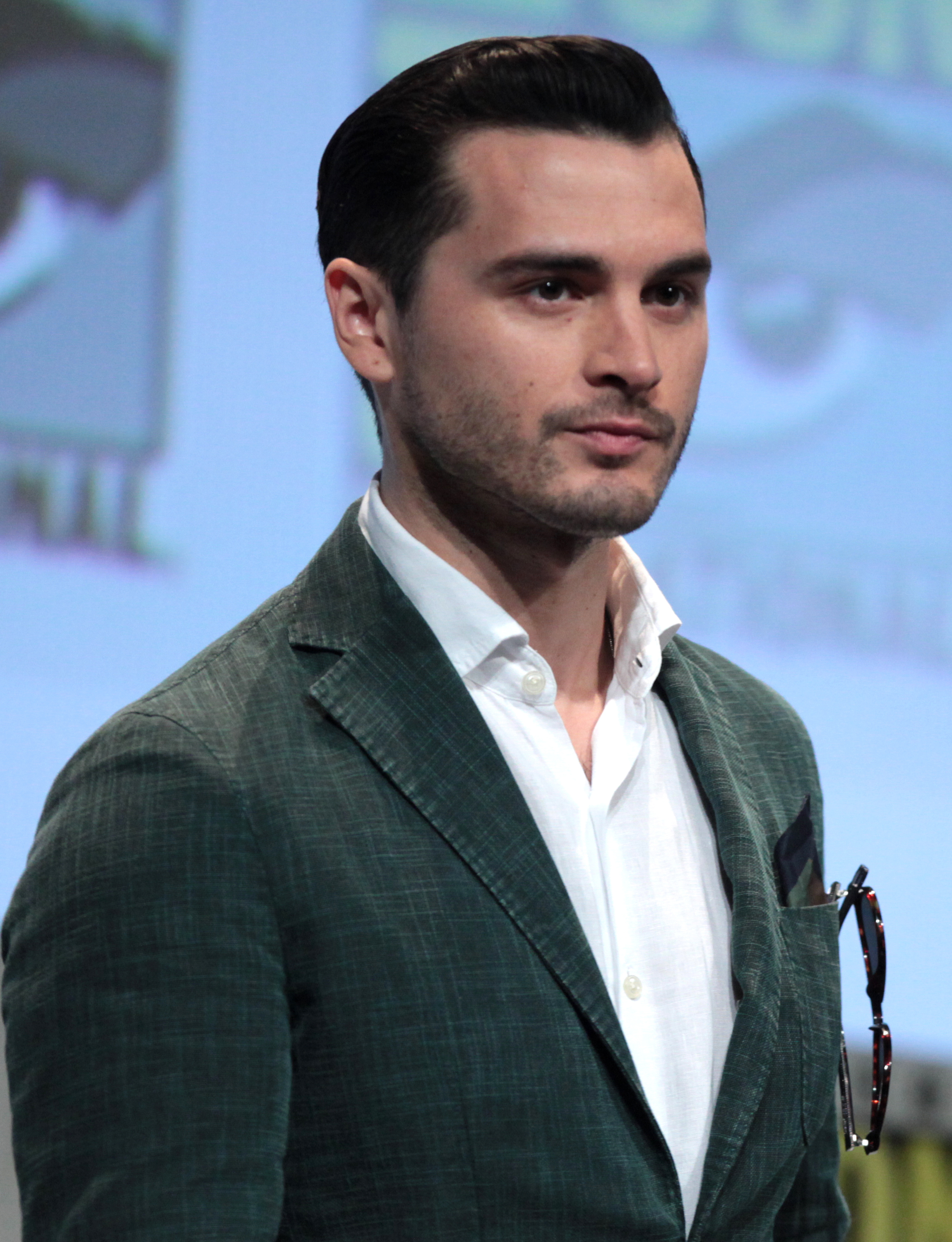
Michael Malarkey

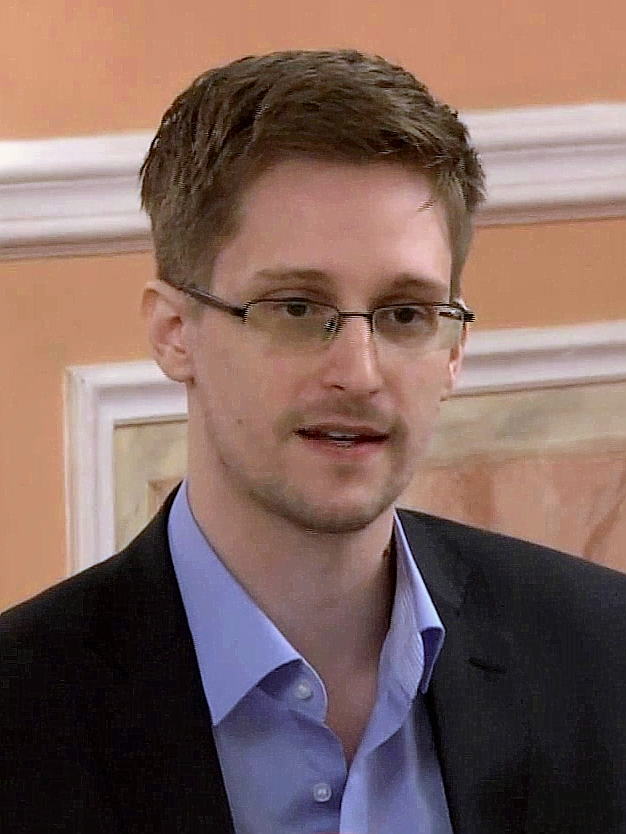
Edward Snowden

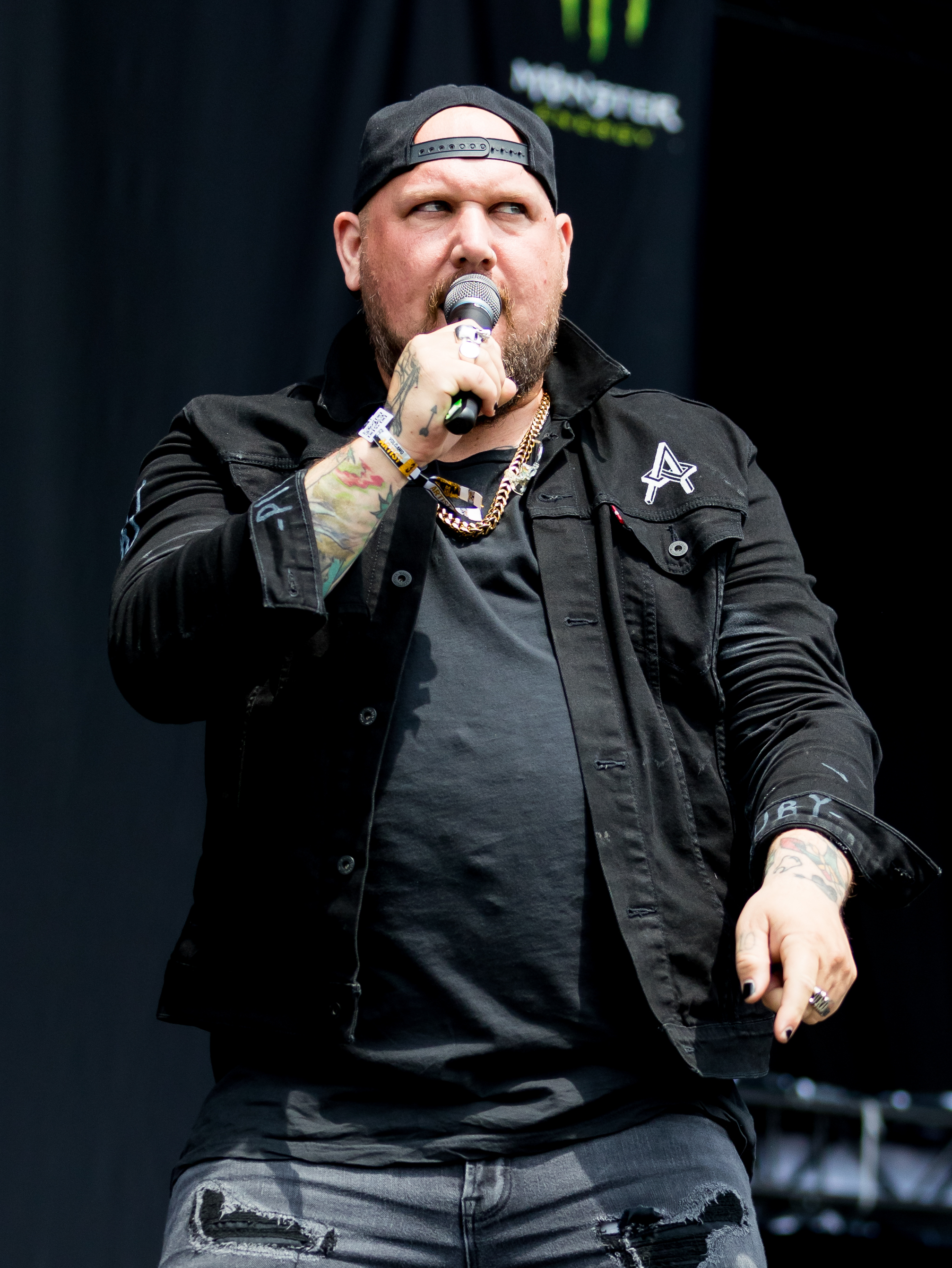
Brandon Saller

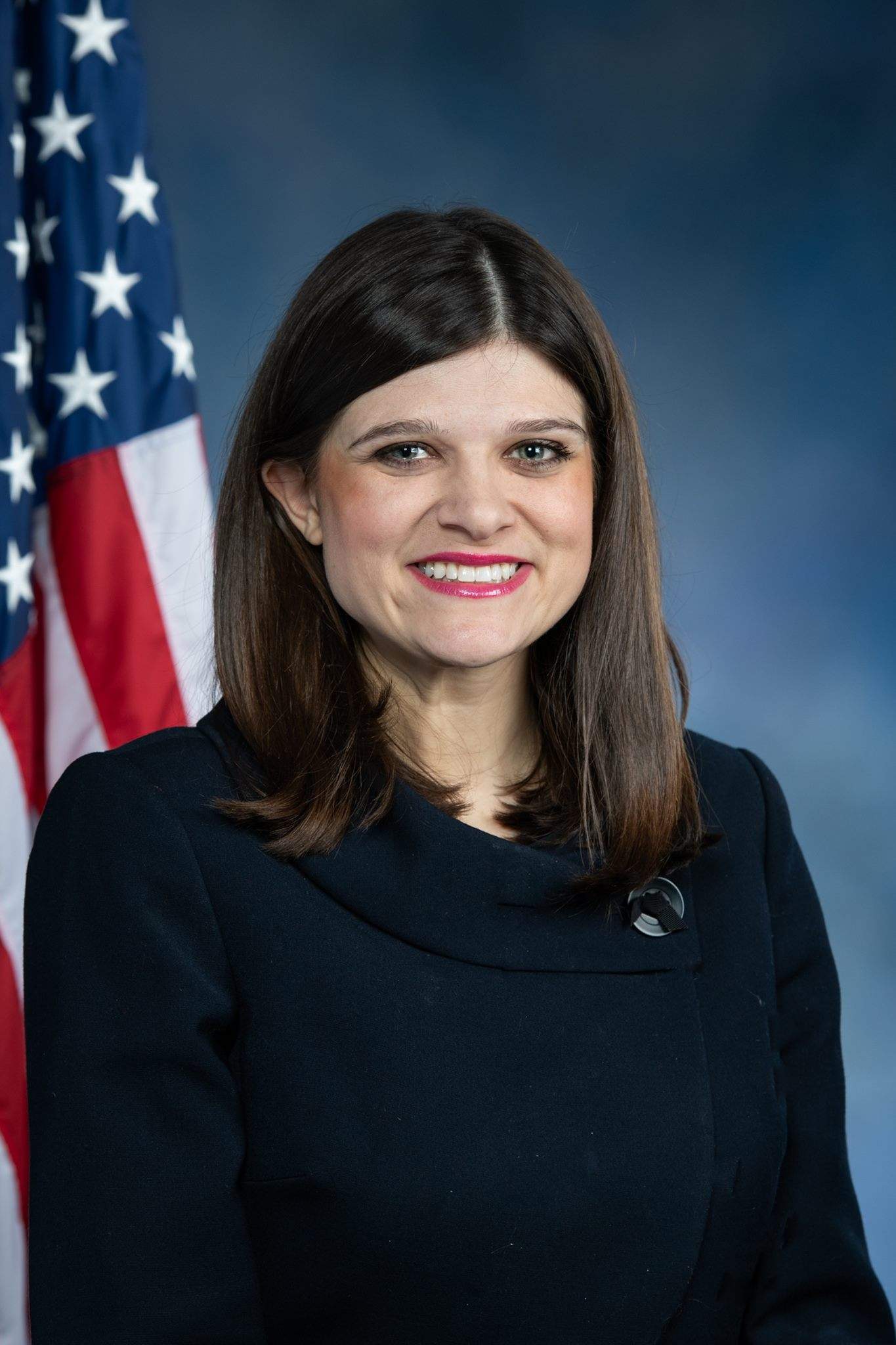
Haley Stevens

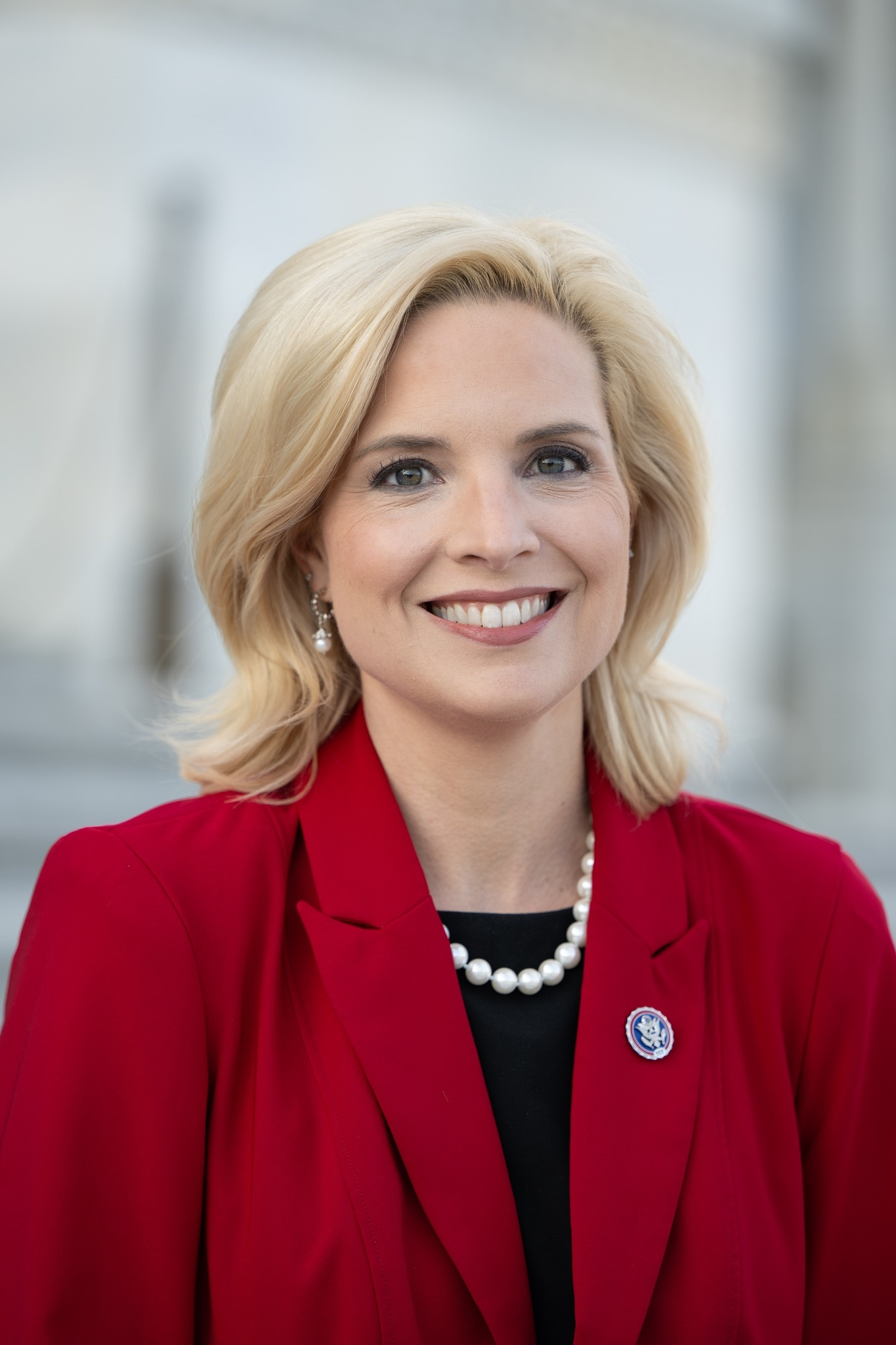
Ashley Hinson

- June 1 – Phillip Alexander, football player
- June 2
  - Delia Ramirez, politician
  - Brooke White, singer
- June 3 – Omar Suleiman, Muslim scholar, civil rights leader, writer, and public speaker
- June 4 – Jon Alston, football player, film director, screenwriter and film producer
- June 5
  - Jason Bedrick, politician
  - Bill Bray, baseball player
- June 6
  - Adam Hendershott, actor
  - Kellen Clemens, football player
- June 7
  - Saad Awad, mixed martial artist
  - Ryan Bader, mixed martial artist
  - Indiggo, Romanian-born twin sisters, singer-songwriters and reality TV personalities
  - Mark Lowe, baseball player
  - Angela McArdle, politician
  - Pierre Pierce, basketball player
- June 8
  - Gaines Adams, football player (d. 2010)
  - Kim Stolz, model, television personality, author, and financial executive
- June 9
  - Andrew Bachman, entrepreneur and investor
  - Justin Benson, director, writer, actor, editor, and producer
  - Rafi Fine, co-founder of React Media, LLC
- June 10
  - Nick Adams, actor, singer, and dancer
  - Marion Barber III, football player (d. 2022)
  - Chase Blackburn, football player
  - Shanna Collins, actress
  - Jason Evigan, musician, singer/songwriter, and record producer
  - Leelee Sobieski, actress
- June 11
  - 2 Pistols, rapper
  - Grant Achilles, basketball player
  - Justin Allgood, football player
  - Justin Shekoski, songwriter, vocalist, and guitarist for Saosin (2003–2015) and The Used (2015–2018)
- June 12 – Chris Witaske, actor
- June 13 – David Begnaud, journalist and news correspondent
- June 15 – Derek Anderson, football player
- June 16
  - Manish Dayal, actor
  - Olivia Hack, actress and voice actress
- June 17 – Jamal Mixon, actor
- June 19
  - Josh Appelt, mixed martial artist
  - Emanuel Ayvas, singer and frontman for Emanuel and the Fear
  - Jason Capizzi, football player
  - Macklemore, rapper
- June 20
  - Patrisse Cullors, activist and co-founder of Black Lives Matter
  - Darren Sproles, football player
- June 21
  - Michael Malarkey, Lebanese-born British-American actor and musician
  - Brian Sites, actor
  - Edward Snowden, government whistleblower
- June 22 – Miles Fisher, actor and musician
- June 23
  - Ini Archibong, artist and designer
  - Miles Fisher, actor, comedian, entrepreneur and musician
  - Kathreen Khavari, actress, writer and producer
  - Brandi Rhodes, wrestler and reality television personality
- June 24
  - Brandon Saller, drummer and vocalist for Atreyu
  - Haley Stevens, politician
- June 27
  - Mickey Bey, boxer
  - Ernest Chavez, mixed martial artist
  - Ashley Hinson, politician
- June 28
  - Brianne Berkson, actress, comedian, and producer
  - Curtis Lepore, actor, musician and internet celebrity
- June 29
  - Paul Appleby, operatic tenor
  - Aundrea Fimbres, singer and member of Danity Kane (2005–2014)
- June 30
  - Nicholas Arciniaga, long-distance runner
  - Blas Avena, mixed martial artist (d. 2016)
  - Josh Beekman, football player
  - Heath Benedict, Dutch-born football player (d. 2008)
  - Cole Swindell, singer

=== July ===
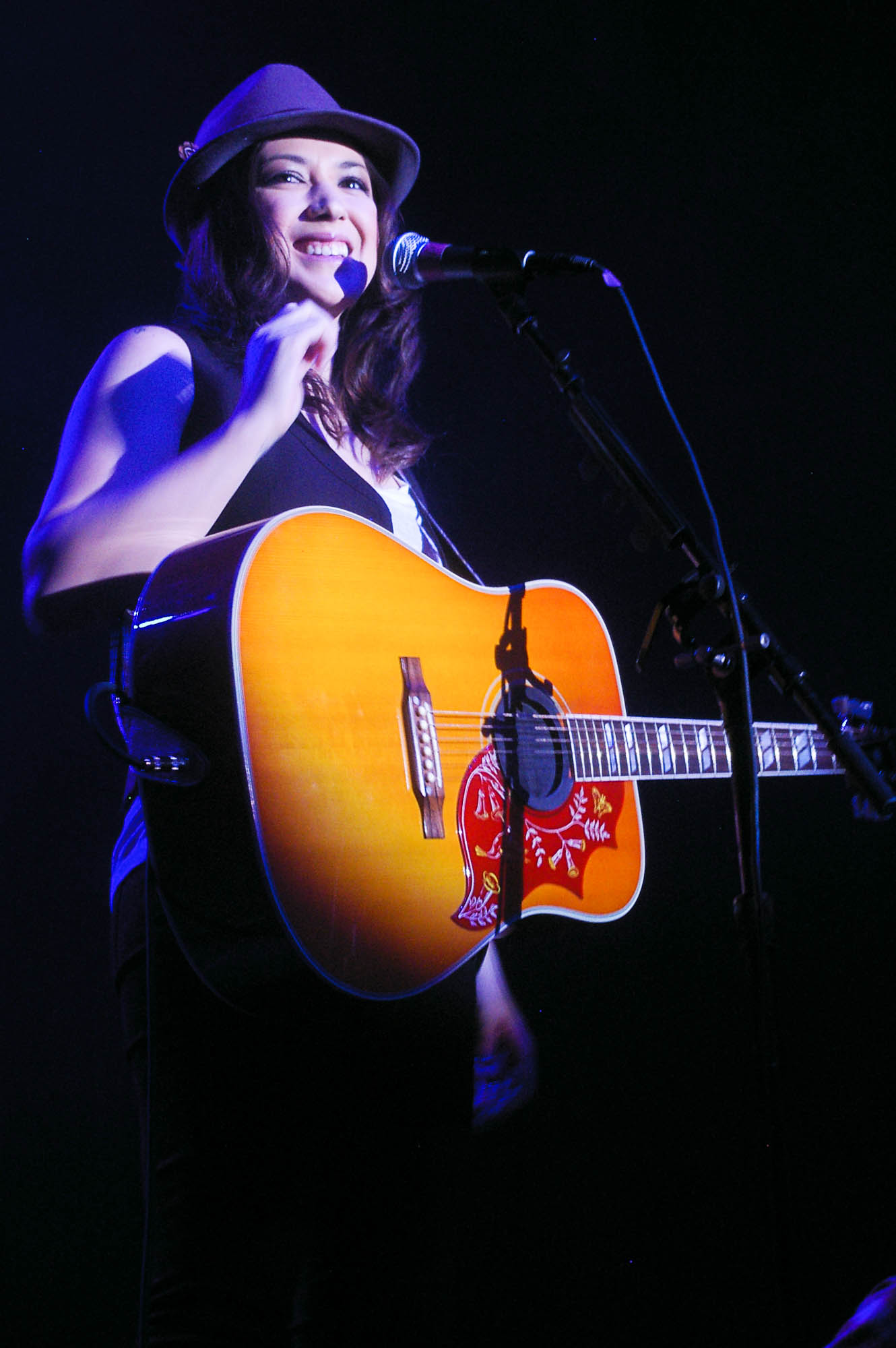
Michelle Branch

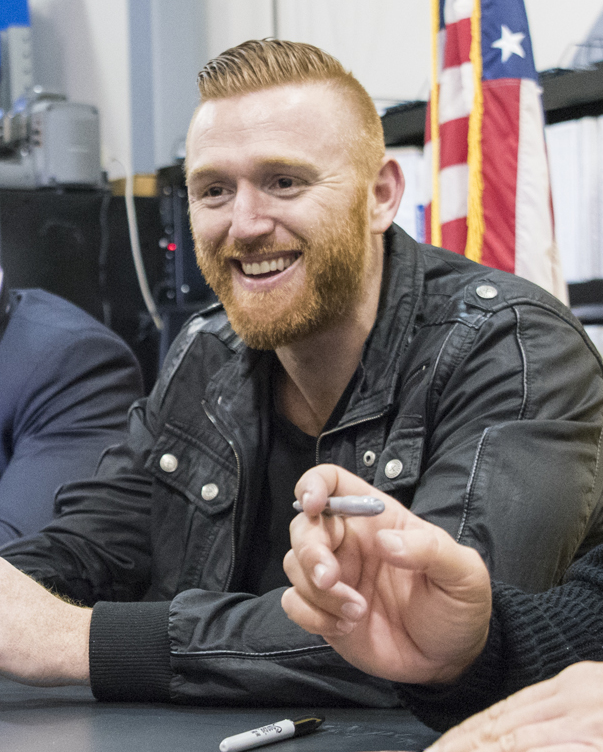
Heath Slater

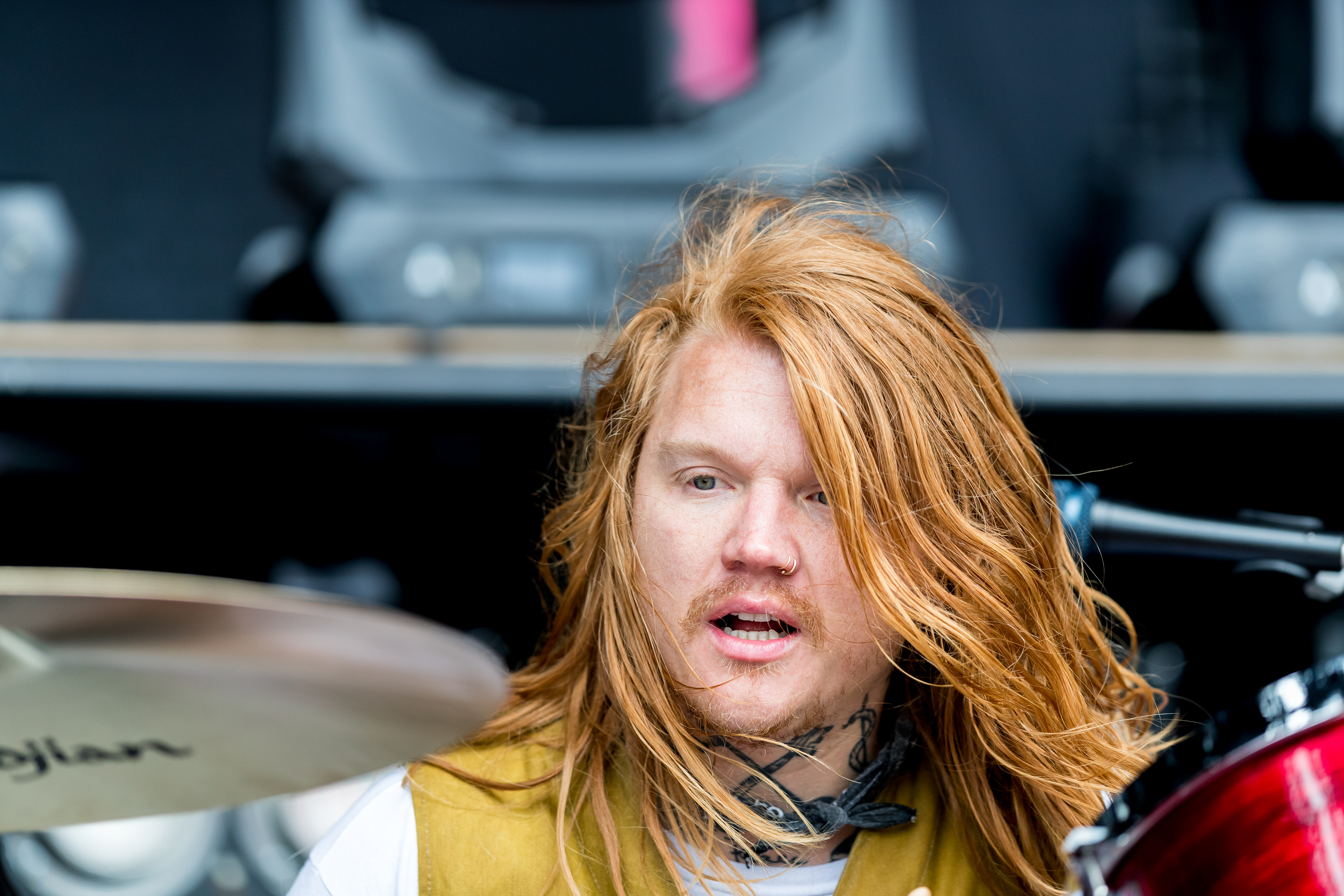
Aaron Gillespie

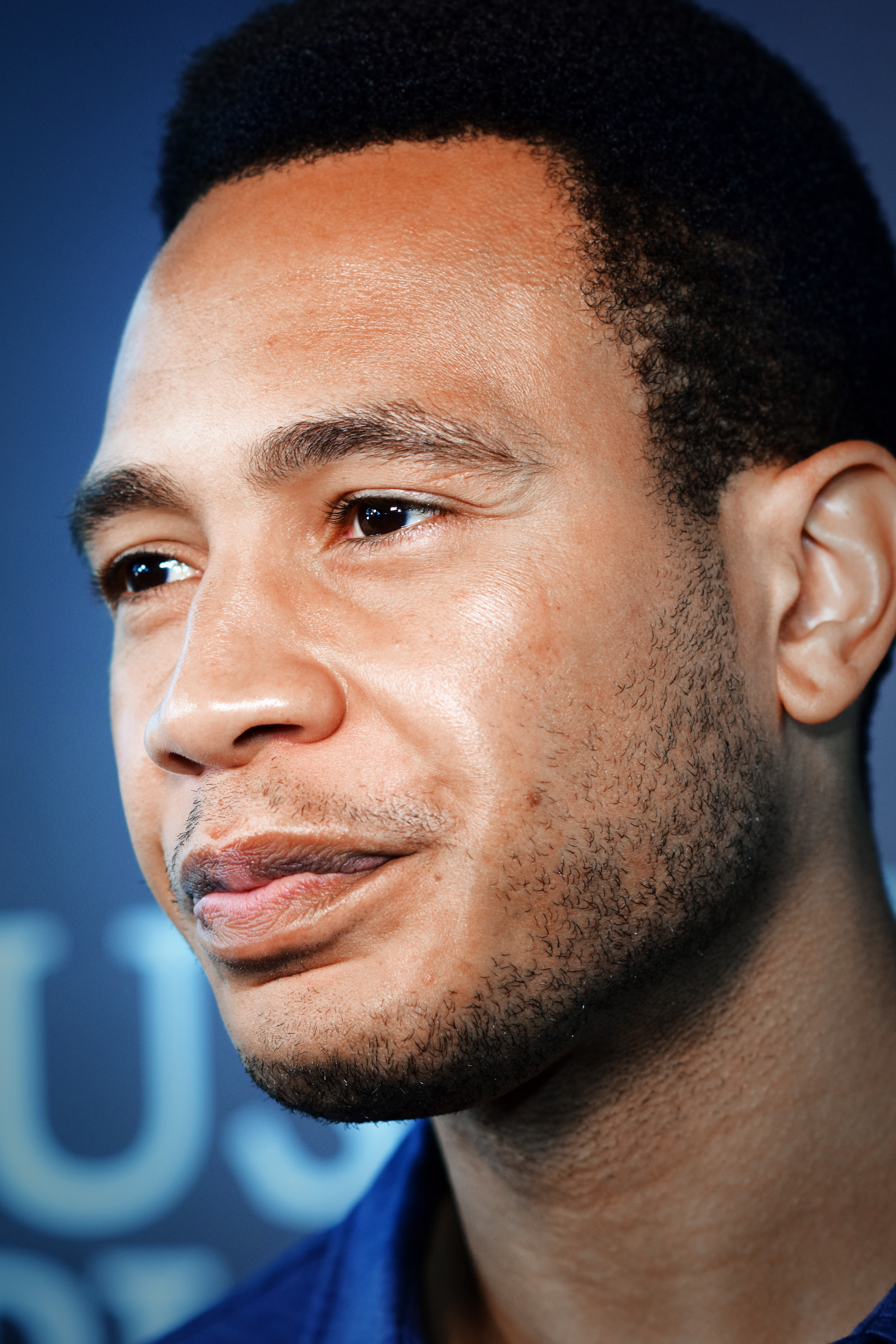
Trai Byers

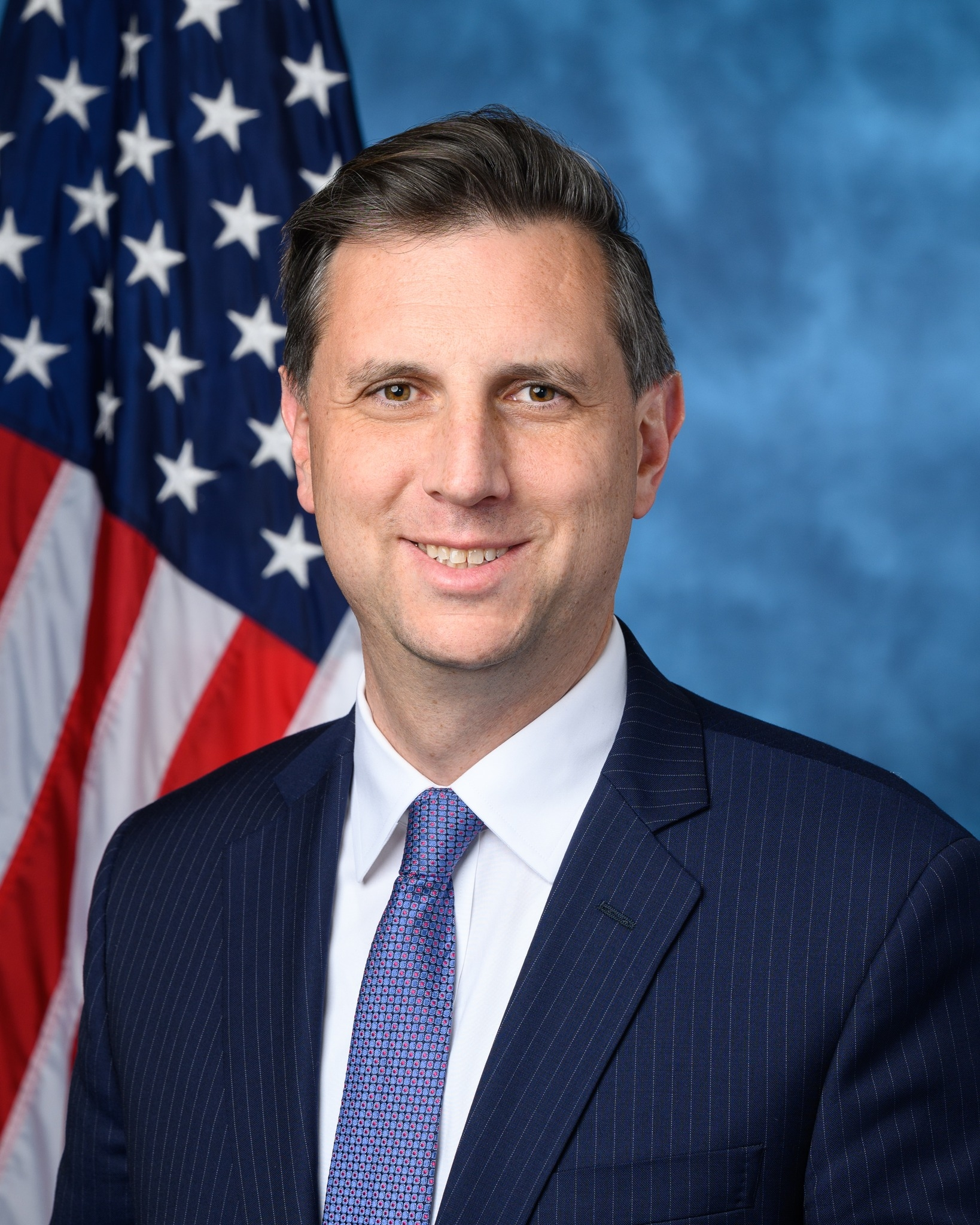
Seth Magaziner

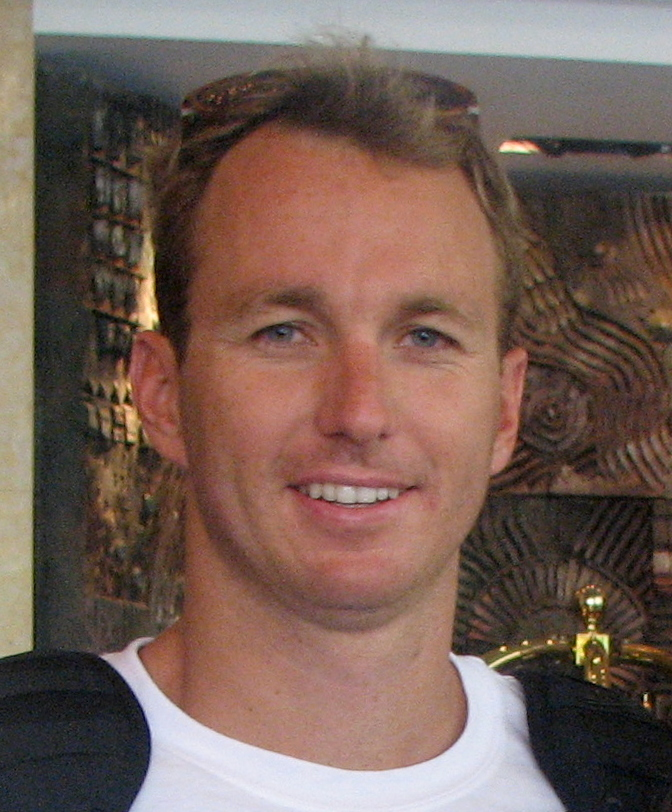
Aaron Peirsol

- July 1
  - Audrey Assad, singer/songwriter
  - Lynsey Bartilson, actress, dancer, and singer
  - Tanya Chisholm, actress and dancer
- July 2
  - Michelle Branch, singer/songwriter
  - Alicia Menendez, television commentator
- July 5
  - Jason Allen, football player
  - James Edson Berto, mixed martial artist
- July 6 – Gregory Smith, Canadian-born actor, writer, and director
- July 7
  - Kristi Capel, beauty pageant and news presenter
  - Robert Eggers, filmmaker
- July 8
  - Ana Ayora, actress
  - DeVaughn Nixon, actor
- July 9
  - Christina Hall, real estate investor and TV personality
  - Christopher Porco, convicted murderer
- July 11 – Joel Salinas, American-born Nicaraguan neurologist, writer, and researcher
- July 12
  - Jason William Adams, actor
  - Howie Kendrick, baseball player
  - Kimberly Perry, singer/songwriter and frontwoman for The Band Perry
- July 14 – Graham Ackerman, gymnast
- July 15
  - Hiro Murai, Japanese-born filmmaker
  - Yuh-Line Niou, Taiwanese-born politician
  - Heath Slater, wrestler
- July 16 – Philando Castile, African-American killed by police
- July 17 – Nick Moore, singer and frontman for Before Their Eyes
- July 18
  - Derrick Barry, drag performer
  - Jennifer Berry, beauty pageant titleholder and Miss America 2006
  - Aaron Gillespie, singer and musician for Underoath
  - Dan McCready, veteran, entrepreneur, civil rights activist, and political candidate
- July 19
  - Gloria Almonte, beauty pageant titleholder
  - Trai Byers, actor and singer
  - Willie Byrd, football player
  - Heath Flora, politician
- July 20 – Dan Book, songwriter and producer
- July 21
  - Bizzle, Christian hip hop artist
  - Wes Felix, sprinter
  - Kellen Winslow II, football player
- July 22
  - Jenni Barber, actress and singer
  - Dan Bazuin, football player
  - Fandango, wrestler
  - Seth Magaziner, politician
- July 23
  - Aaron Peirsol, Olympic swimmer
- July 24
  - Collin Ashton, football player
  - Joey Kovar, model and television personality (d. 2012)
- July 26
  - Albert Bimper, football player and athletic director
  - Elettra Weidemann, fashion model and socialite
- July 27
  - Joseph Boncore, politician
  - Lauren Murphy, mixed martial artist
  - Blair Redford, actor
- July 28
  - David Anderson, football player
  - Steve Baylark, football player
  - Kate Bolduan, television journalist and CNN anchor
  - Noah Robertson, drummer
- July 29
  - Kaitlyn Black, actress
  - Kristin Fisher, journalist
  - Tania Gunadi, Indonesian-born actress and producer
  - Elise Testone, singer/songwriter

=== August ===
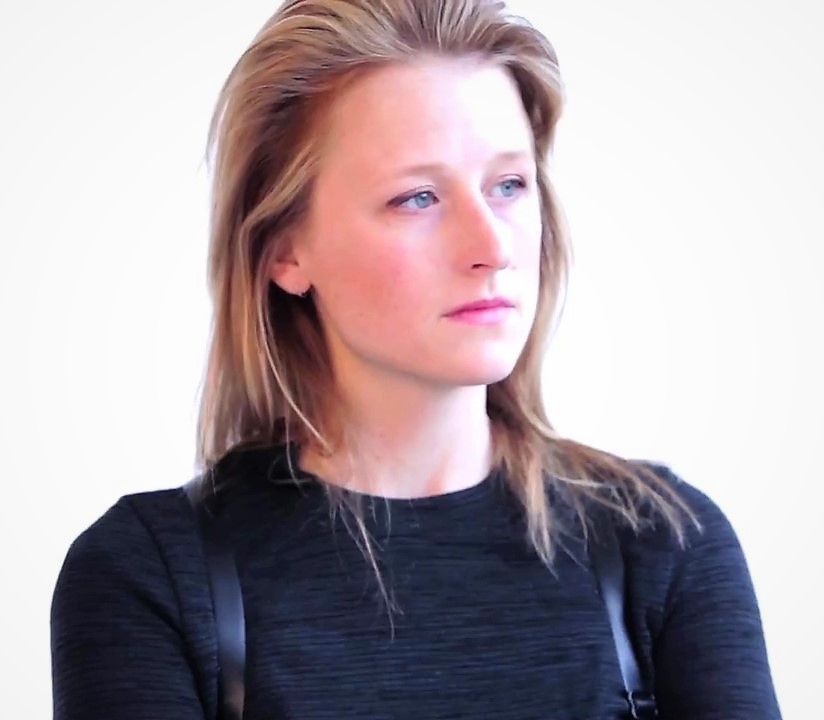
Mamie Gummer

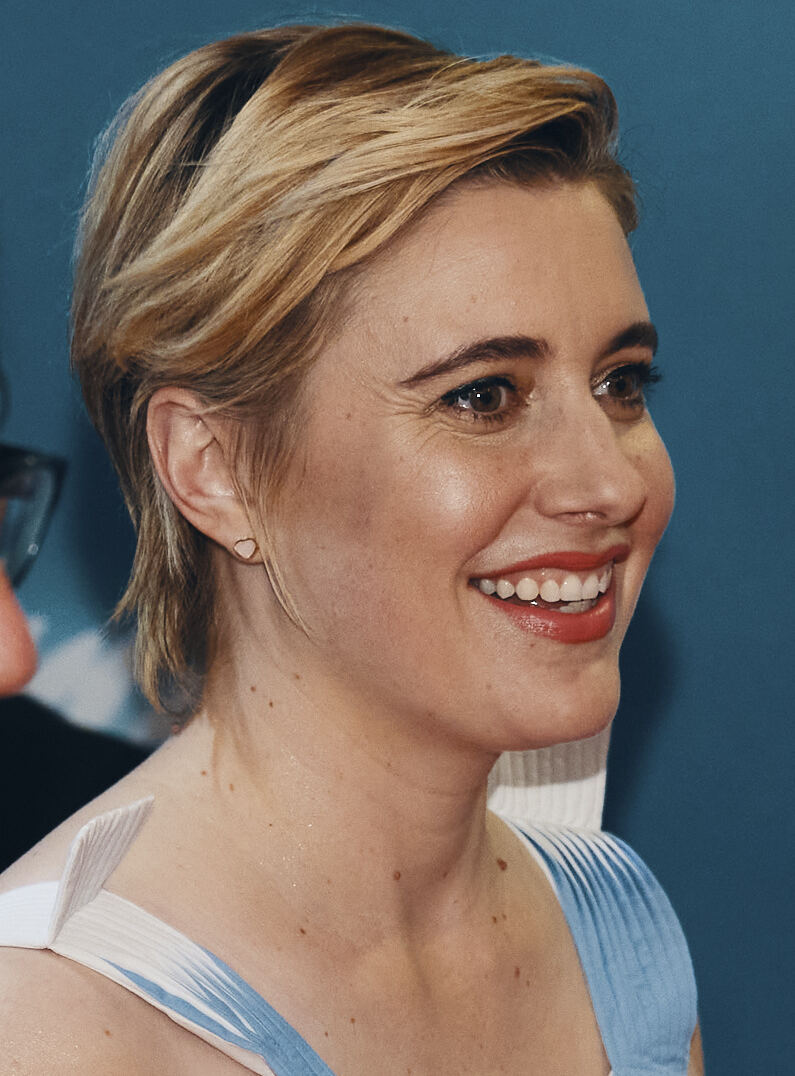
Greta Gerwig

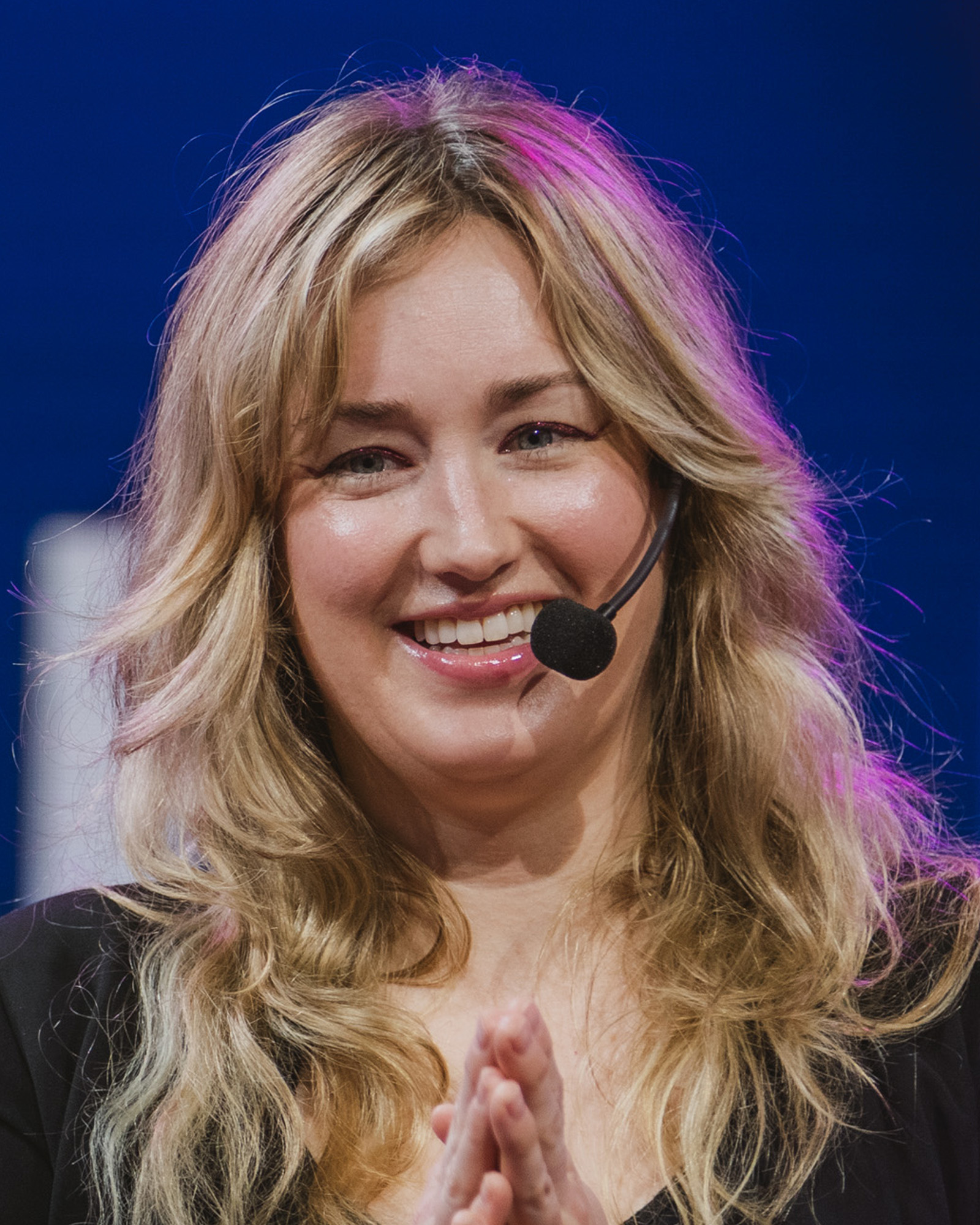
Ashley Johnson

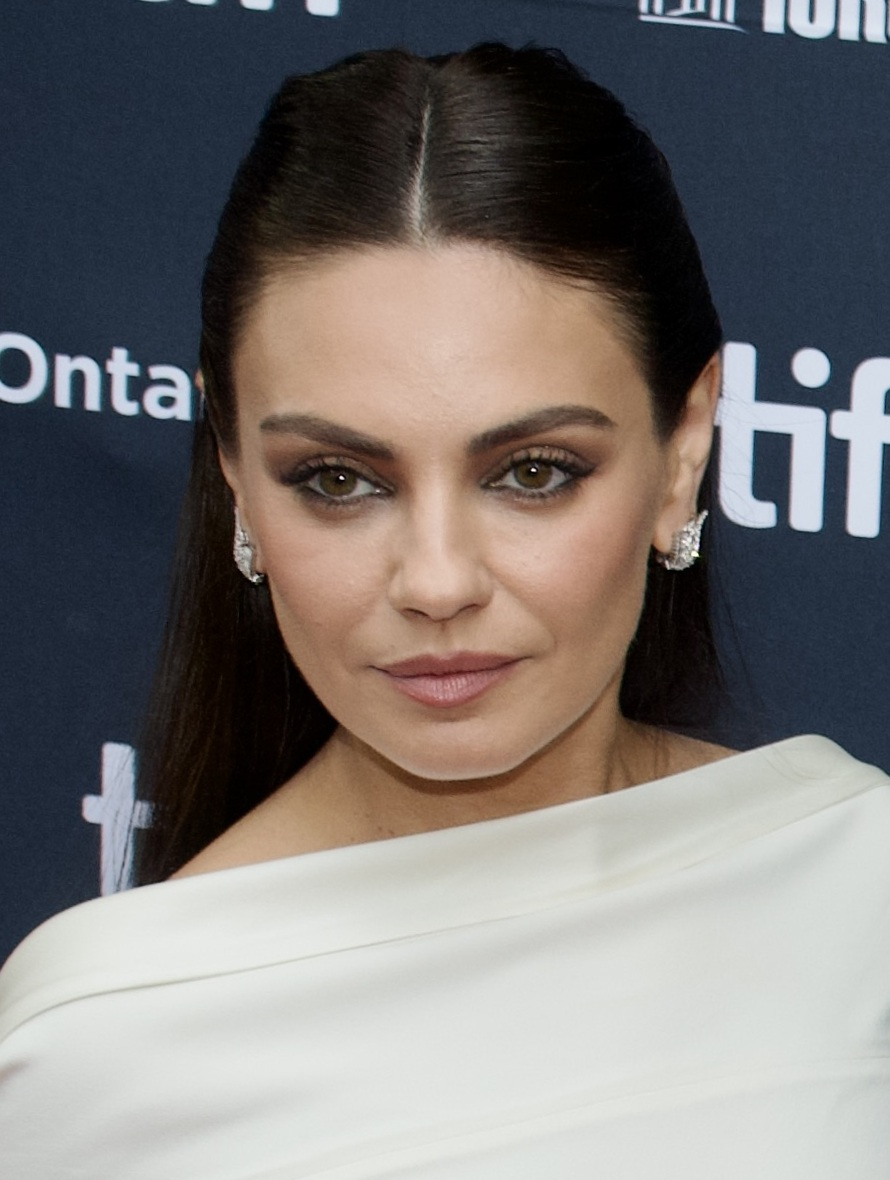
Mila Kunis

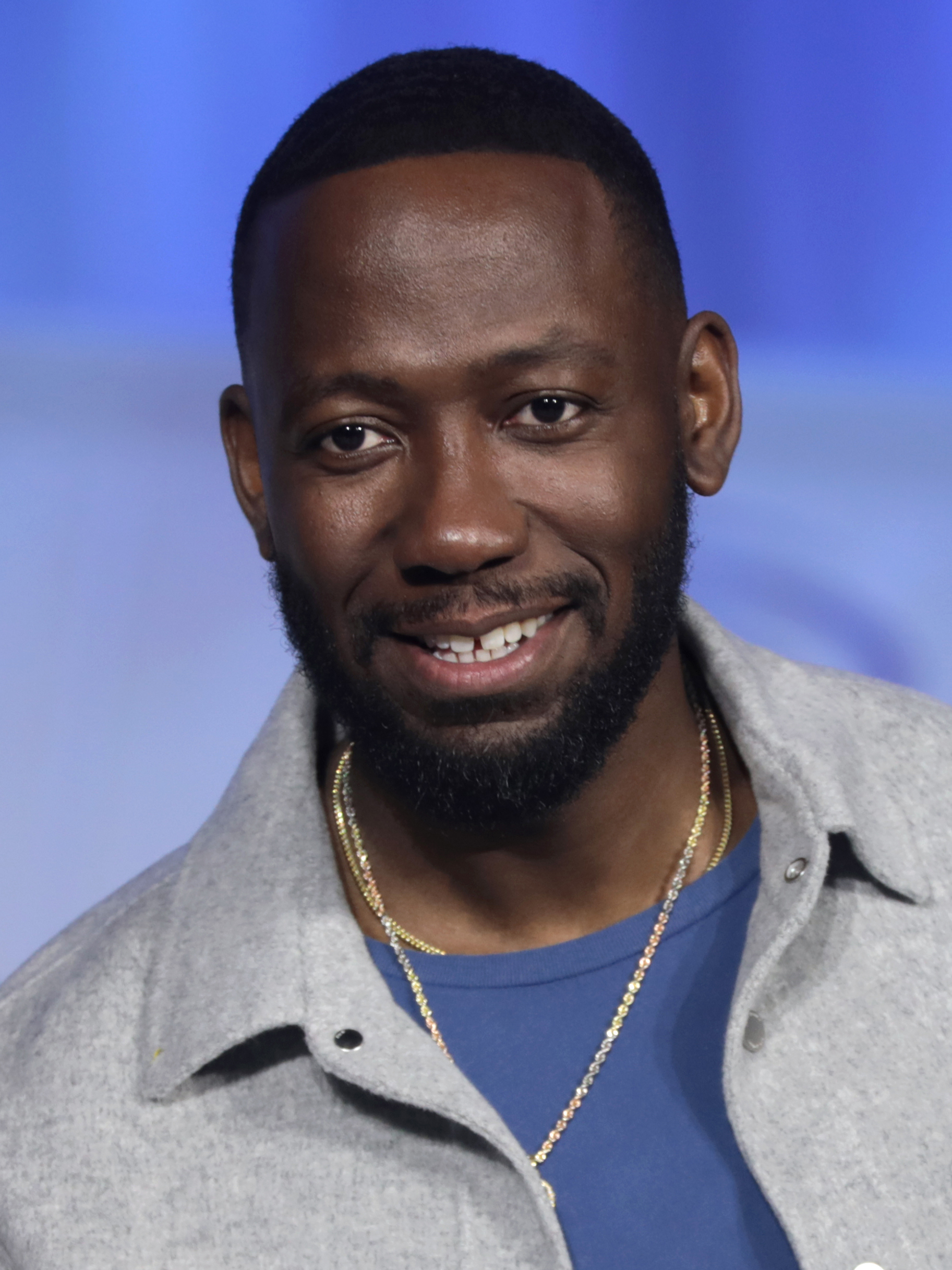
Lamorne Morris

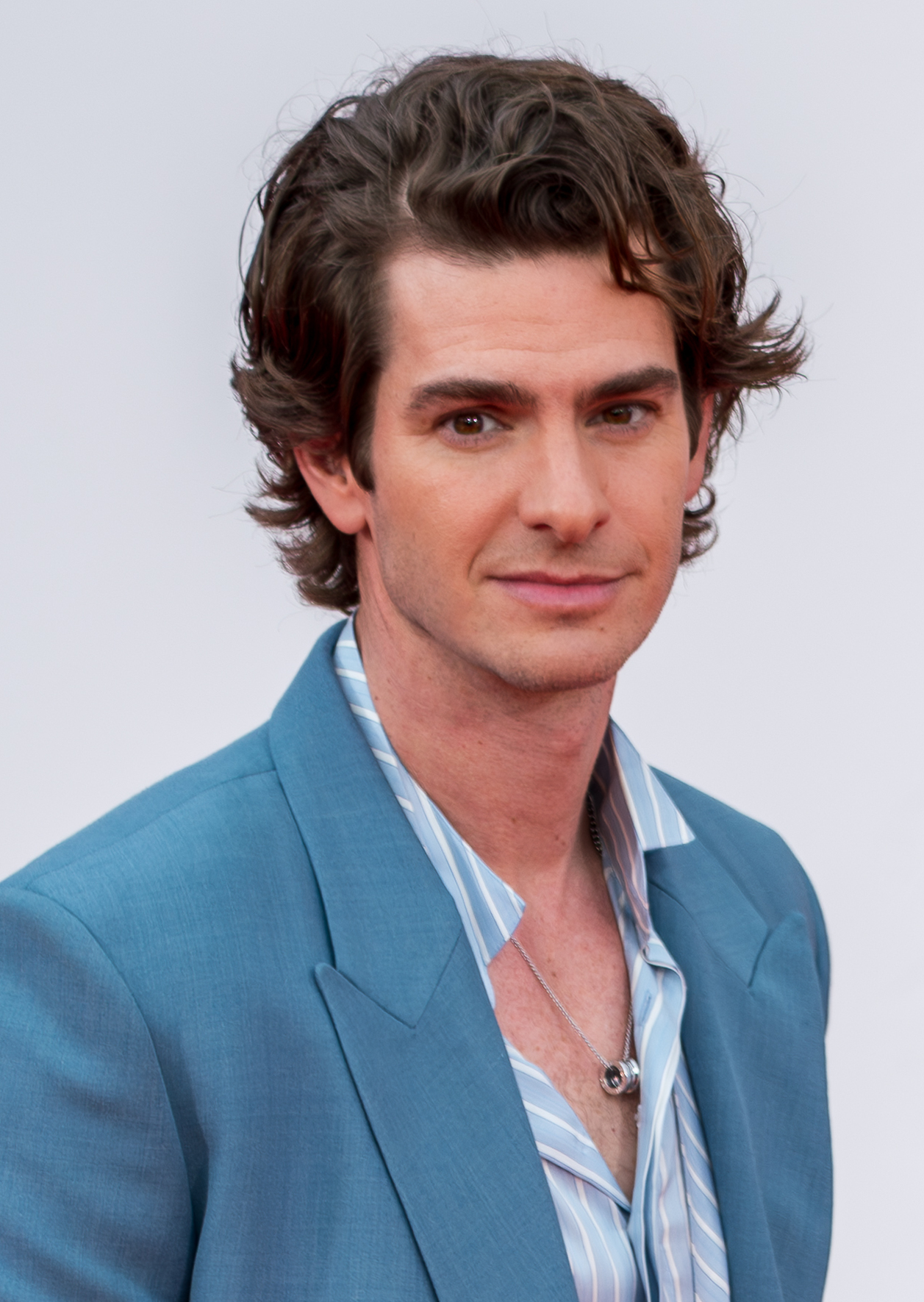
Andrew Garfield

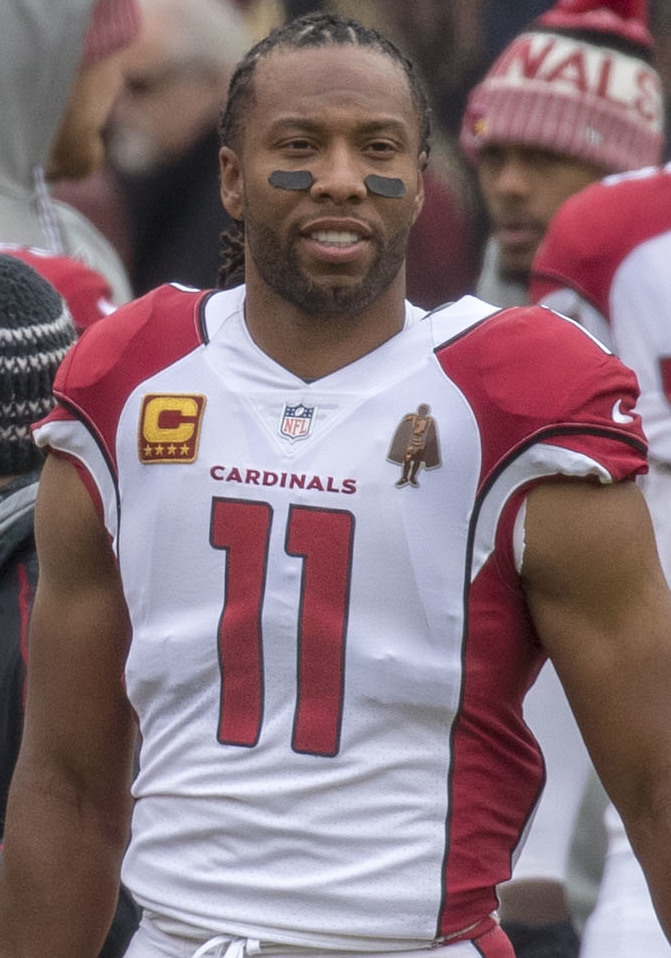
Larry Fitzgerald

- August 3 – Mamie Gummer, actress
- August 4
  - Beth Bombara, singer/songwriter and musician
  - Greta Gerwig, actress and filmmaker
- August 5
  - Aaron Alafa, boxer
  - Beau Black, composer, producer, musician, singer/songwriter, and instrumentalist
  - Dawn Richard, singer and member of Danity Kane (2005–2020)
- August 6
  - C. J. Mosley, football player
  - Landon Pigg, singer/songwriter and actor
- August 7 – Brit Marling, actress, screenwriter and producer
- August 8 – Fred Meyers, actor
- August 9
  - Terry Adams, BMX bicyclist
  - Virginia Giuffre, sex trafficking victim and activist (d. 2025)
  - Ashley Johnson, actress and voice actress
- August 10
  - Tone Bell, comedian and actor
  - C.B. Dollaway, mixed martial artist
  - Kristen Mann, basketball player
  - Spencer Redford, actress
- August 11
  - Drumma Boy, rapper and record producer
  - Joe Pinion, entrepreneur, television host, and political candidate
- August 13 – Rob Schmitt, television personality and host
- August 14
  - Black Milk, rapper, songwriter, and record producer
  - Jon Hoadley, politician
  - Mila Kunis, Ukrainian-born actress
  - Lamorne Morris, actor and comedian
  - Spencer Pratt, television personality and political candidate
- August 15
  - Sean Feucht, Christian singer/songwriter, former worship leader at Bethel Church, and founder of the Let Us Worship movement
  - Lex Fridman, Russian-American scientist and podcaster
  - Nicole Paggi, actress
- August 16 – Colt Brennan, football player (died 2021)
- August 17
  - Vance Aloupis, politician
  - Dustin Pedroia, baseball player
- August 18 – Rex Richardson, politician, mayor of Long Beach, California (2022–present)
- August 19
  - Danny Baggish, Guamanian-born darts player
  - John McCargo, American football player
  - Mike Moh, actor and martial artist
- August 20
  - Hamza Abdullah, football player
  - Andrew Garfield, actor
  - Chase Pistone, stock car racing driver (d. 2026)
- August 21 – Brody Jenner, television personality
- August 23
  - Vada Azeem, author, illustrator, and songwriter
  - J. C. Bailey, wrestler (d. 2010)
  - Annie Ilonzeh, actress
- August 24
  - Brett Gardner, baseball player
  - Tino Sabbatelli, wrestler
- August 25
  - Hanif Abdurraqib, poet, essayist, and cultural critic
  - Andrew Aydin, comic writer and political aide
- August 26 – Rob Cantor, singer/songwriter
- August 27 – Amir Sadollah, professional mixed martial artist
- August 28
  - Baby Boy da Prince, rapper
  - Kimberly Kane, actress
  - Nate Washington, football player
- August 29 – Jennifer Landon, actress
- August 30
  - David Banks, Olympic rower
  - Jim Miller, mixed martial artist
- August 31
  - Larry Fitzgerald, football player
  - Devan Chandler Long, actor

=== September ===
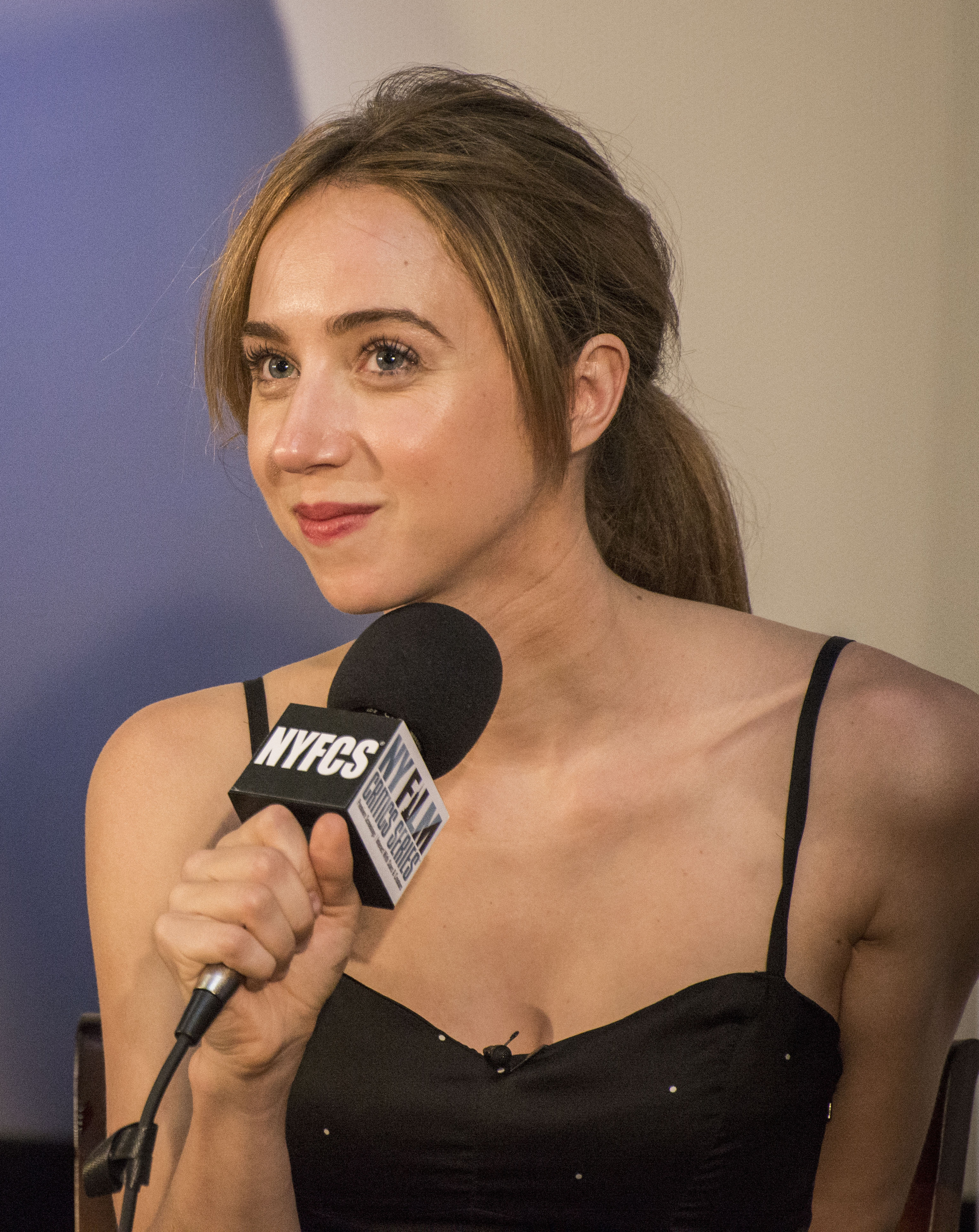
Zoe Kazan

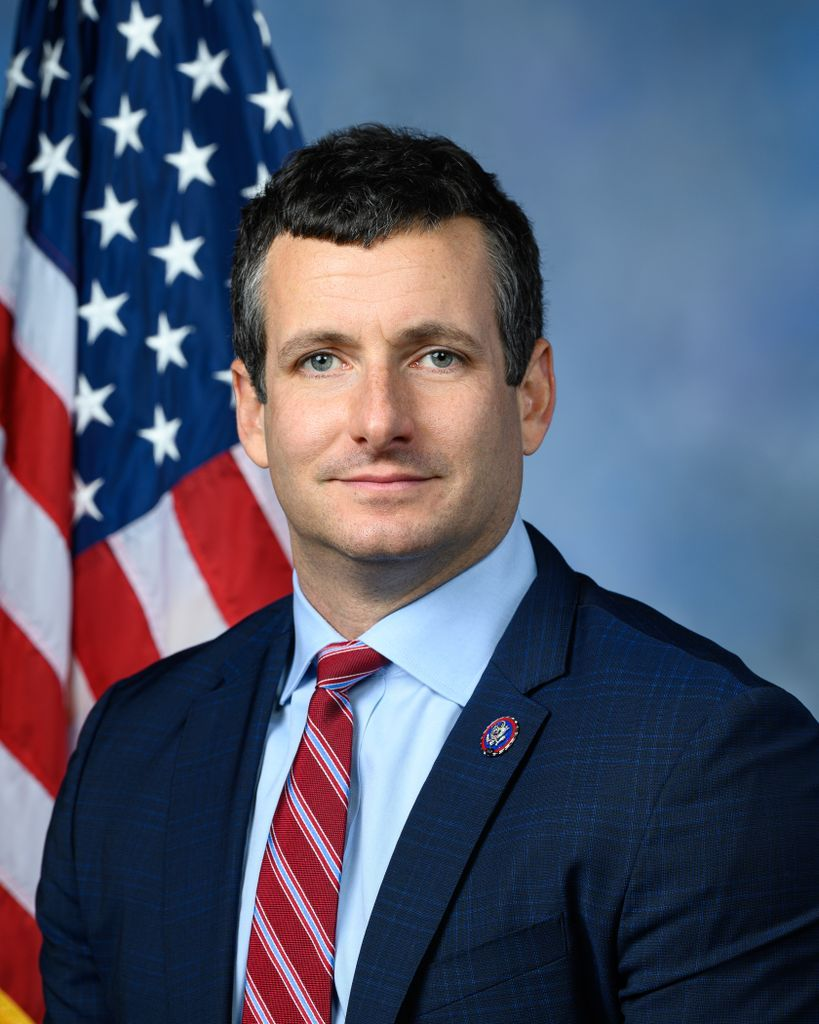
Trey Hollingsworth

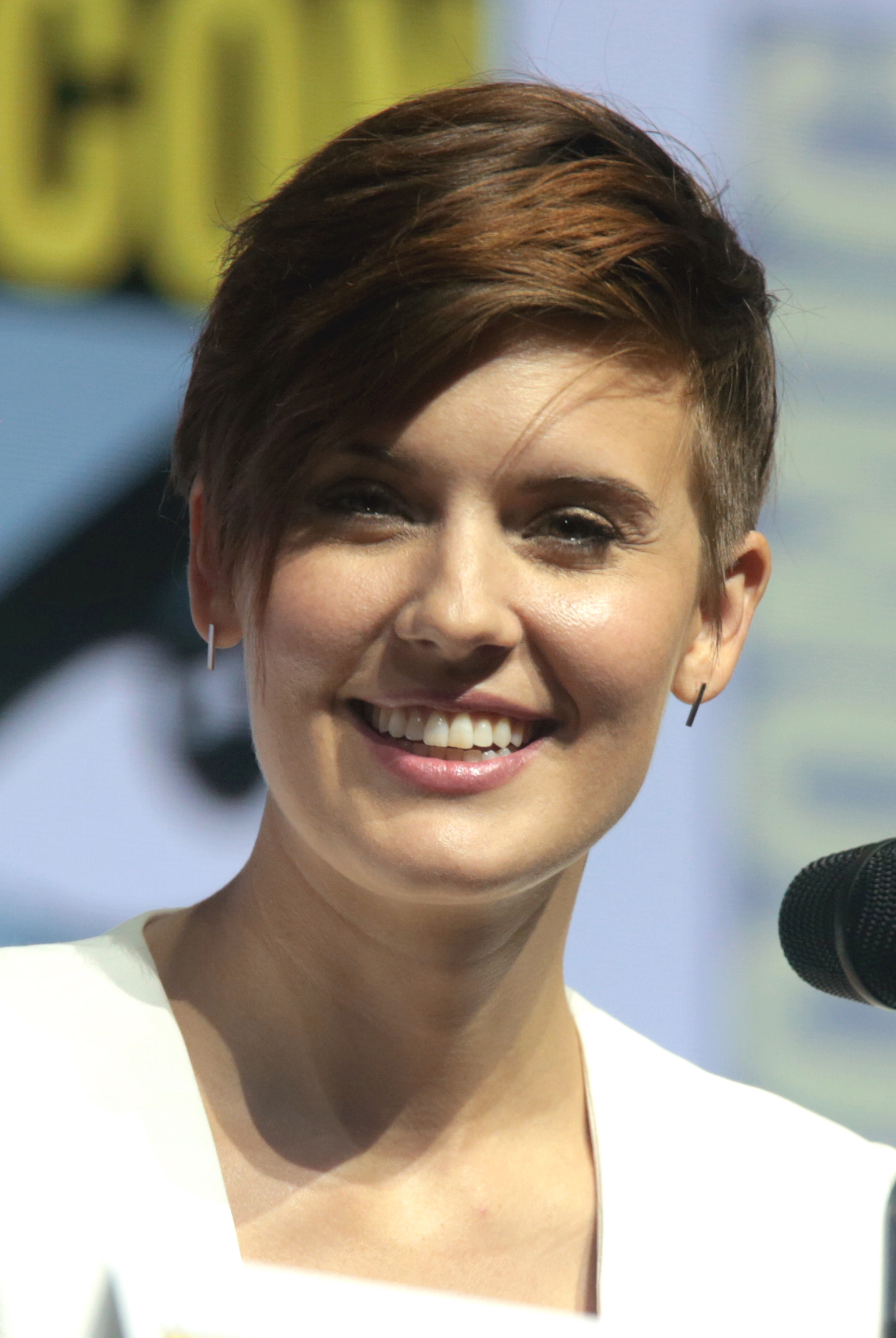
Maggie Grace

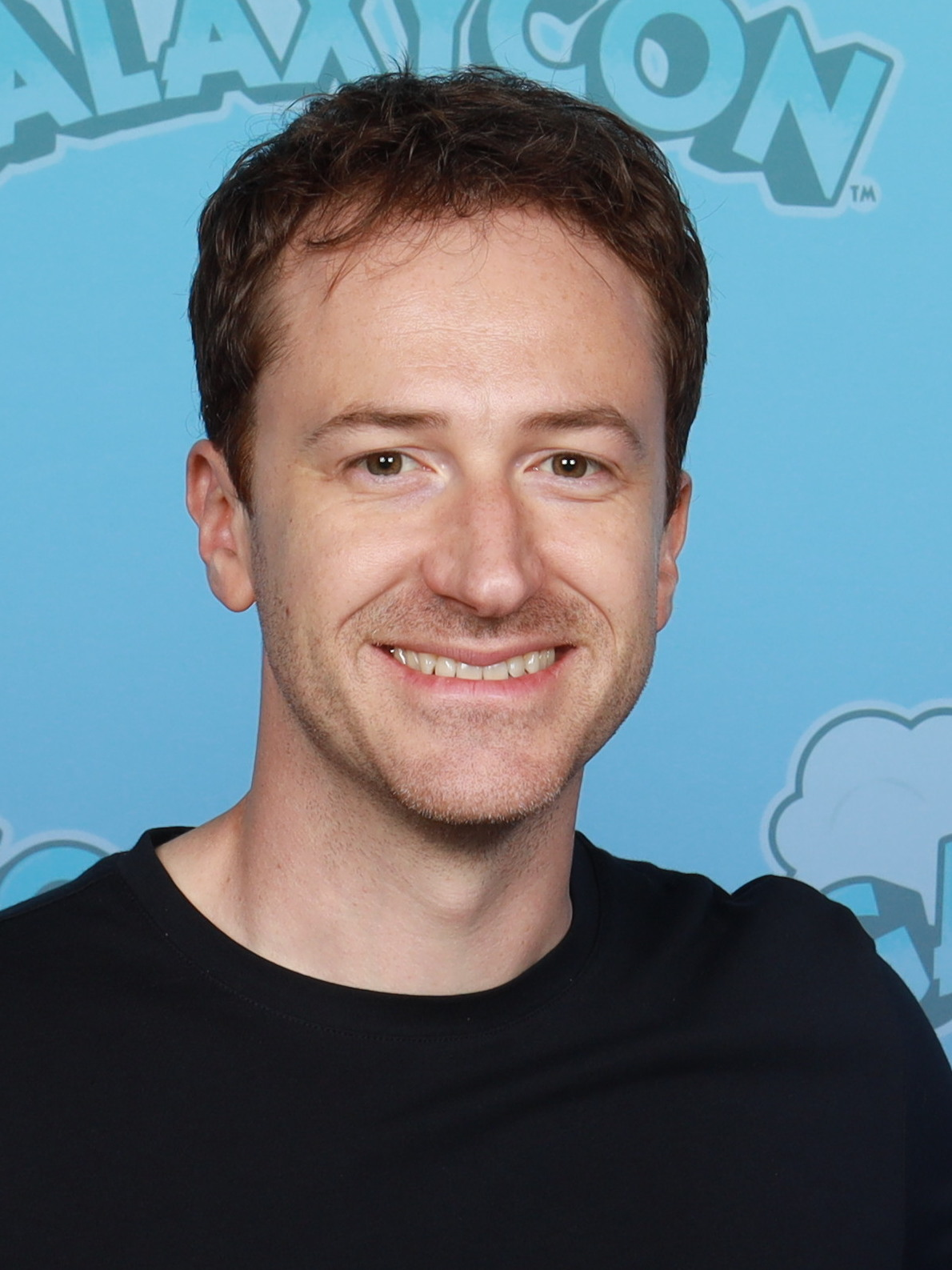
Joseph Mazzello

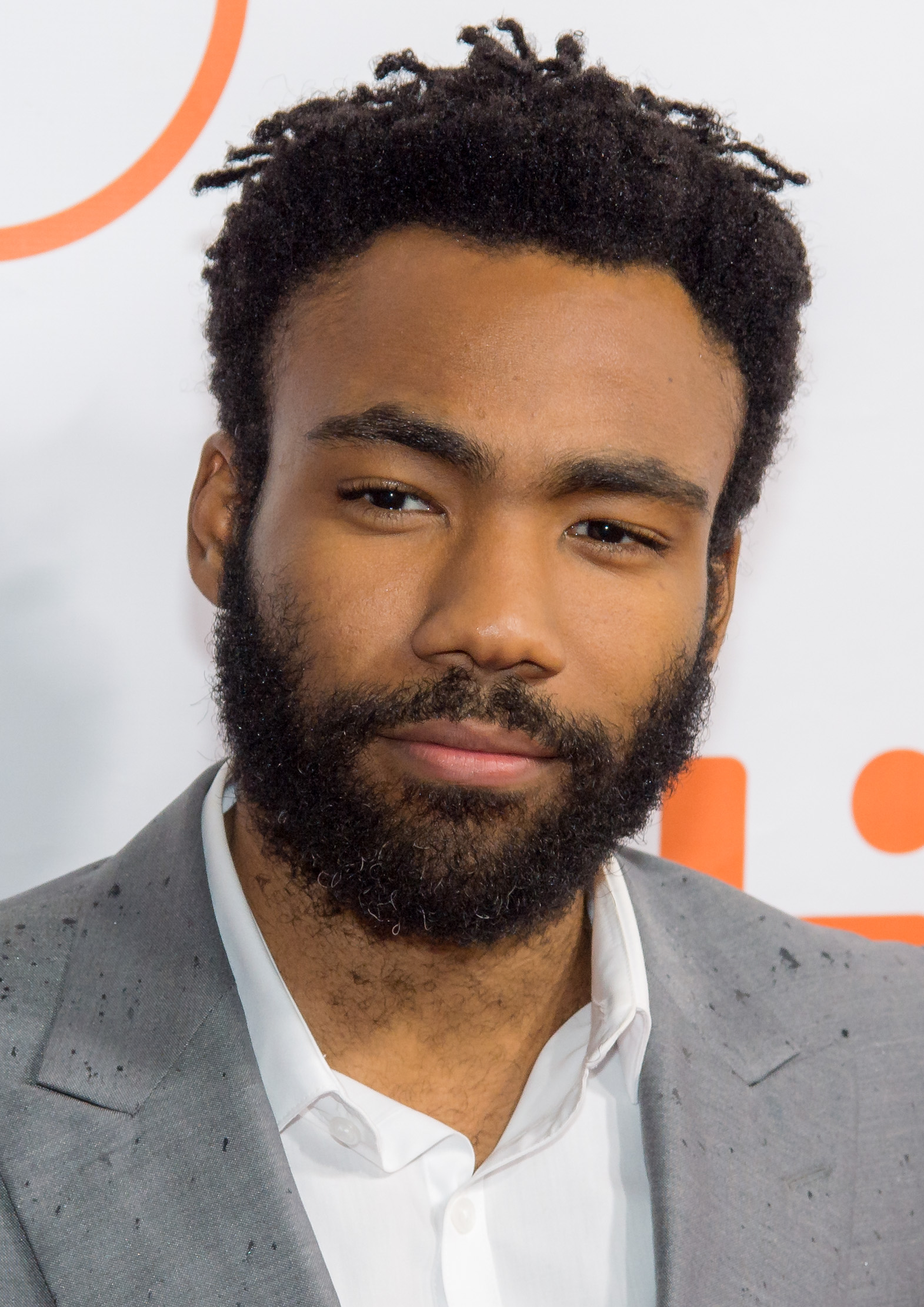
Donald Glover

- September 1 – Camille Mana, actress
- September 2
  - Lester Abram, basketball player
  - Jenny Berrigan, Deaflympic snowboarder
  - Tiffany Hines, actress and singer
- September 3
  - Adam Bergen, football player
  - Christine Woods, actress
- September 4 – Landis Blair, illustrator and comics artist
- September 5 – Lincoln Riley, football coach
- September 6
  - Jerry Blevins, baseball player
  - Braun Strowman, pro wrestler
- September 7 – Andre Berto, boxer
- September 8 – Will Blalock, basketball player
- September 9
  - Michael Allan, football player
  - Jason Benetti, sportscaster
  - Zoe Kazan, actress and screenwriter
  - Aryn Michelle, Christian musician and songwriter
- September 10
  - Francesca Fiorentini, comedian
  - Shawn James, Guyanese-born basketball player
  - Sarah Schneider, writer, actress, and comedian
- September 11 – Jacoby Ellsbury, baseball player
- September 12
  - Nicholas Barton, director, producer, screenwriter, editor, and cinematographer
  - Johny Hendricks, mixed martial artist
  - Trey Hollingsworth, politician
  - Carly Smithson, singer
- September 15 – Holly Montag, television personality
- September 17 – Jennifer Peña, singer
- September 19
  - Omar Elba, Egyptian-born actor
  - Joey Devine, baseball player
  - Charlie Haeger, baseball player (d. 2020)
- September 20
  - Rick DeJesus, singer/songwriter and frontman for Adelitas Way
  - Yuna Ito, American-born Japanese singer and actress
  - Doug Thomas, basketball player
- September 21
  - Scott Evans, actor
  - Maggie Grace, actress
  - Joseph Mazzello, actor
- September 23
  - Jason Lancaster, singer/songwriter
  - David Lim, actor
  - Shane del Rosario, mixed martial artist and kickboxer (d. 2013)
- September 24 – Randy Foye, basketball player
- September 25 – Donald Glover, actor and singer/songwriter
- September 26
  - James Anderson, football player
  - Zoe Perry, actress
- September 27
  - Amelia Boone, obstacle racer and lawyer
  - Shannon Lucas, drummer for All That Remains (2006) and The Black Dahlia Murder (2007–2012)
- September 28
  - Mike Balogun, boxer
  - Julissa Bermudez, Dominican-born television personality and actress
  - Summer Rae, wrestler and model
  - Sarah Wright, actress
- September 29 – Marcel Rodríguez-López, keyboardist and percussionist for The Mars Volta and drummer for Zechs Marquise

=== October ===
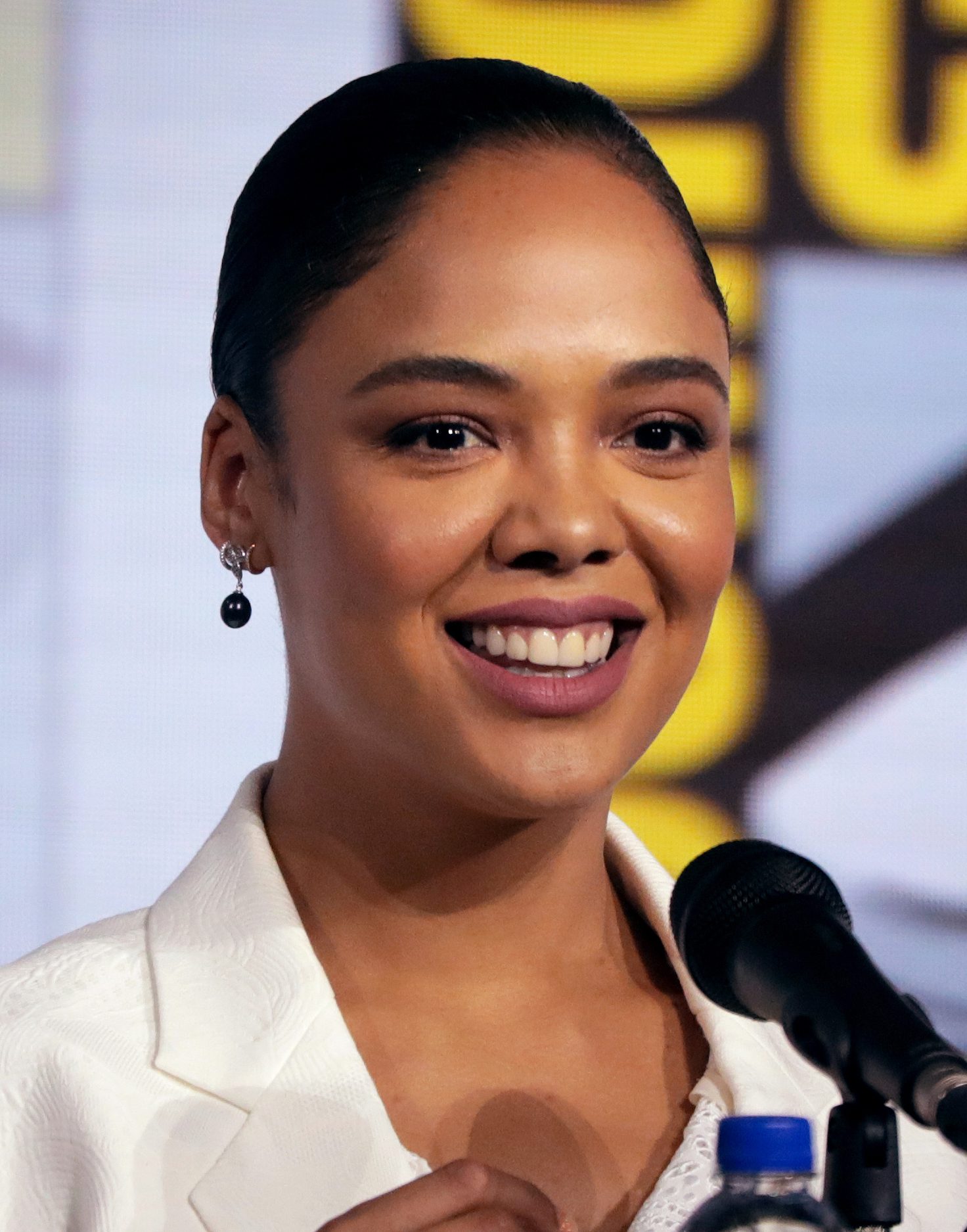
Tessa Thompson

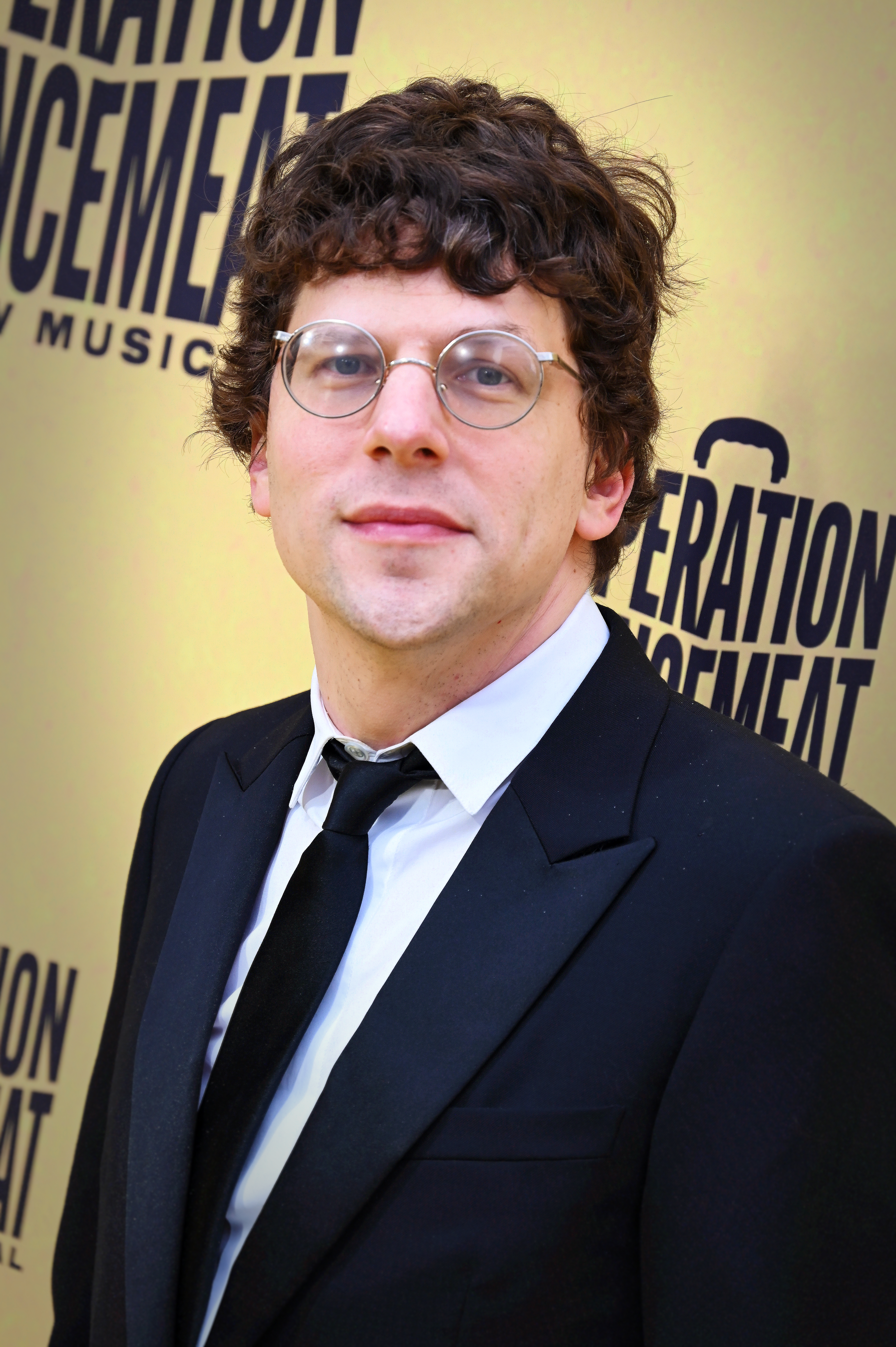
Jesse Eisenberg

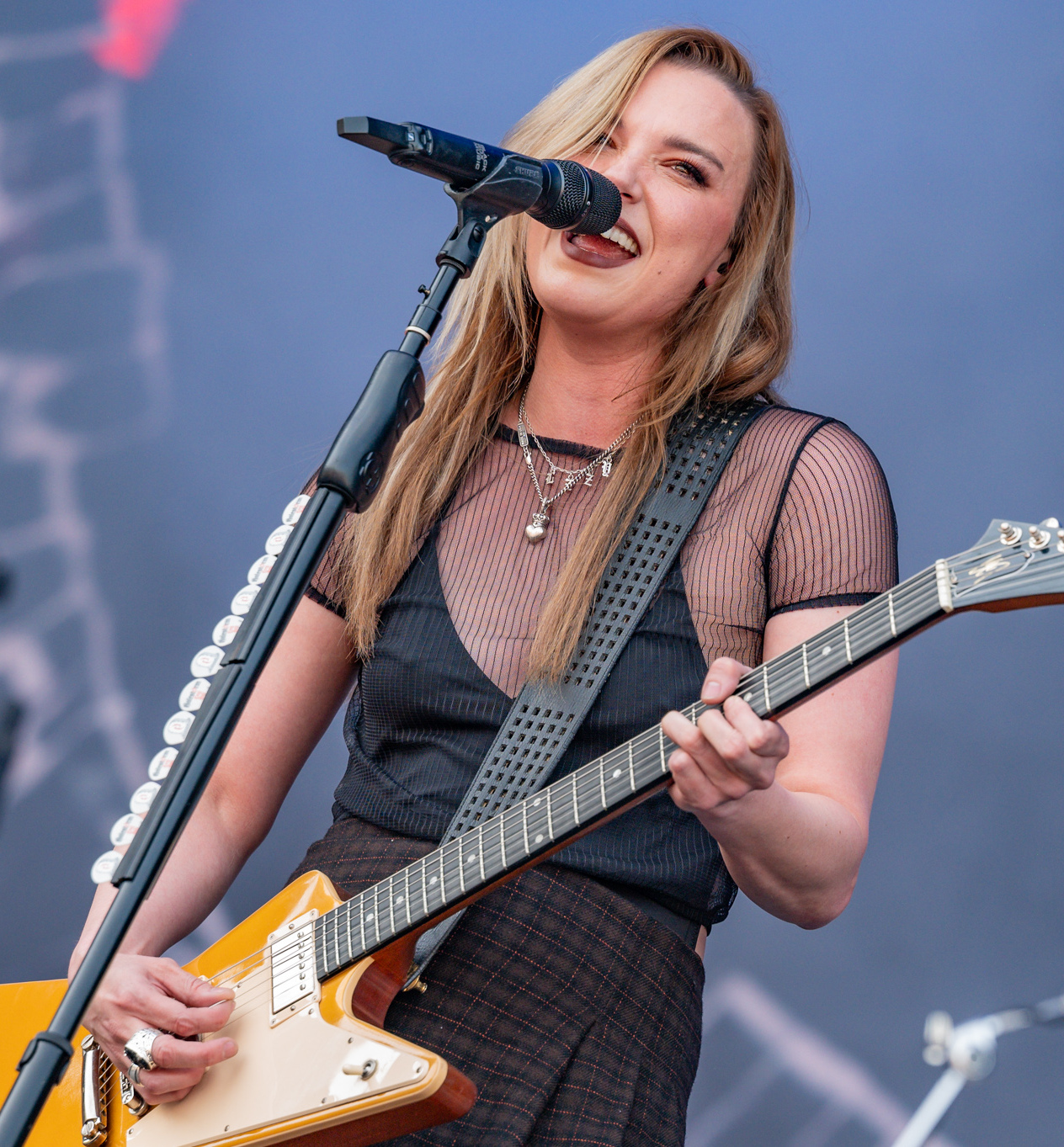
Lzzy Hale

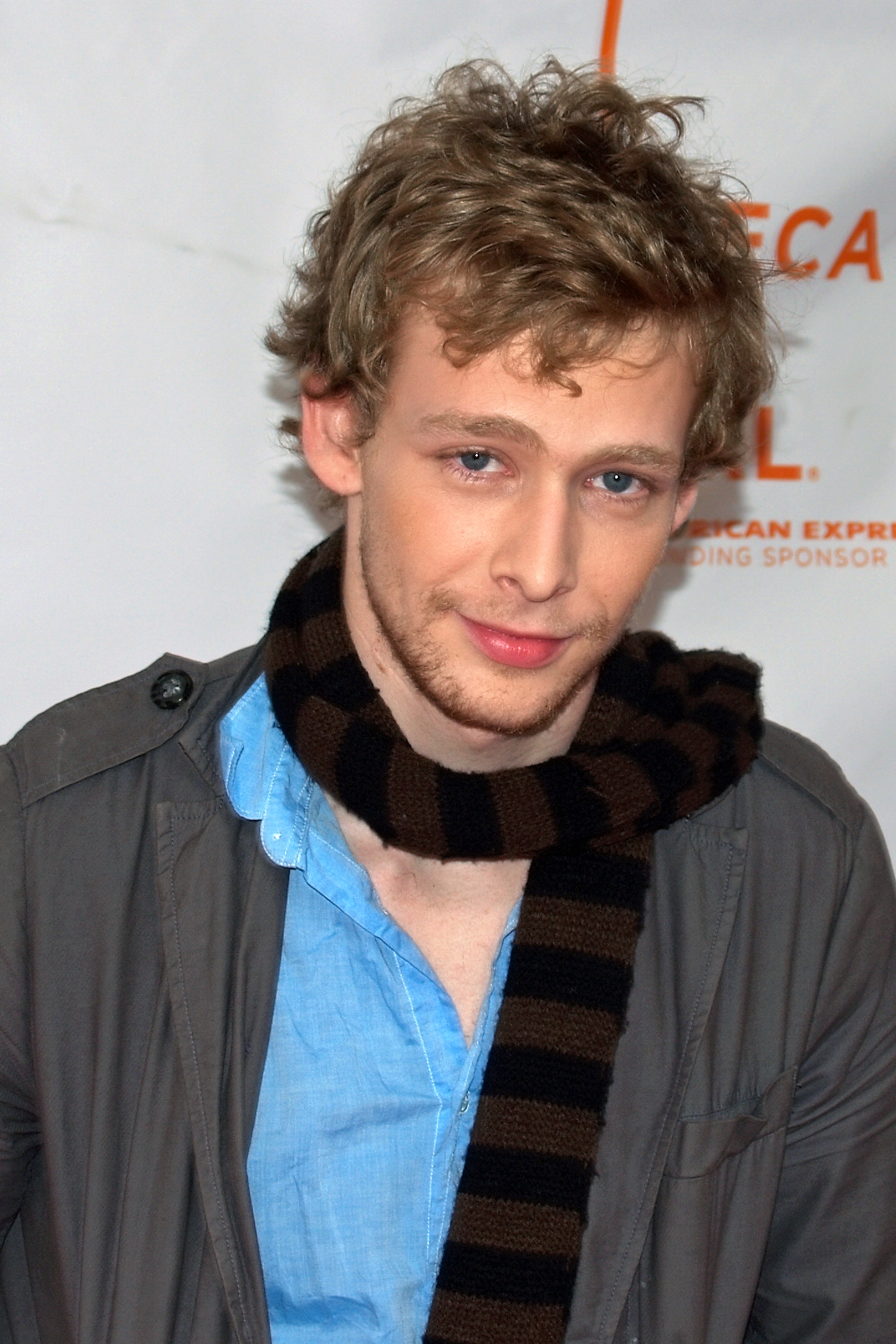
Johnny Lewis

- October 1 – Jackie Battle, football player
- October 2
  - Prakash Amritraj, American-born Indian tennis player
  - Huda Kattan, makeup artist
  - Gerran Walker, football player
- October 3
  - Mikey Batts, wrestler
  - Olga Bell, Russian-born musician, music producer, composer, and singer/songwriter
  - Tessa Thompson, actress
- October 4 – John Anthony Castro, tax consultant and political candidate
- October 5
  - Jesse Eisenberg, actor
  - Shelby Rabara, actress and singer
  - Nicky Hilton Rothschild, model and socialite
- October 6
  - Larry Birdine, football player
  - Andy T. Tran, actor
- October 7 – Flying Lotus, musician
- October 9 – Spencer Grammer, actress
- October 10 – Lzzy Hale, singer/songwriter, musician, lead vocalist and guitarist for Halestorm
- October 13 – Kamerion Wimbley, football player
- October 14
  - Tony Cavalero, actor and comedian
  - Robert James Miller, U.S. Army veteran and Medal of Honor recipient (d. 2008)
- October 15 – Chris Barclay, football player
- October 16
  - Ryan Blaum, golfer
  - Brad Boles, politician
  - Andrew Santino, comedian, actor, and podcaster
- October 17 – Daniel Booko, actor and model
- October 19 – Cara Santa Maria, neuroscientist and writer
- October 20 – Ryan Quarles, politician
- October 21
  - Zack Greinke, baseball player
  - Amber Rose, model and actress
  - Aaron Tveit, actor
- October 23
  - Adrienne Bailon, singer, actress, and television personality
  - Sam Brown, Army Captain and political candidate
- October 24
  - Adrienne Bailon, singer and actress, member of 3LW
  - Brian Vickers, race car driver
- October 25 – Adrian Awasom, football player
- October 27
  - Berner, rapper
  - Katy Tur, broadcast journalist
  - Melanie Minichino, voice actress
- October 29 – Johnny Lewis, actor (d. 2012)
- October 30
  - Brandon Archer, football player
  - Andrew Schulz, comedian

=== November ===
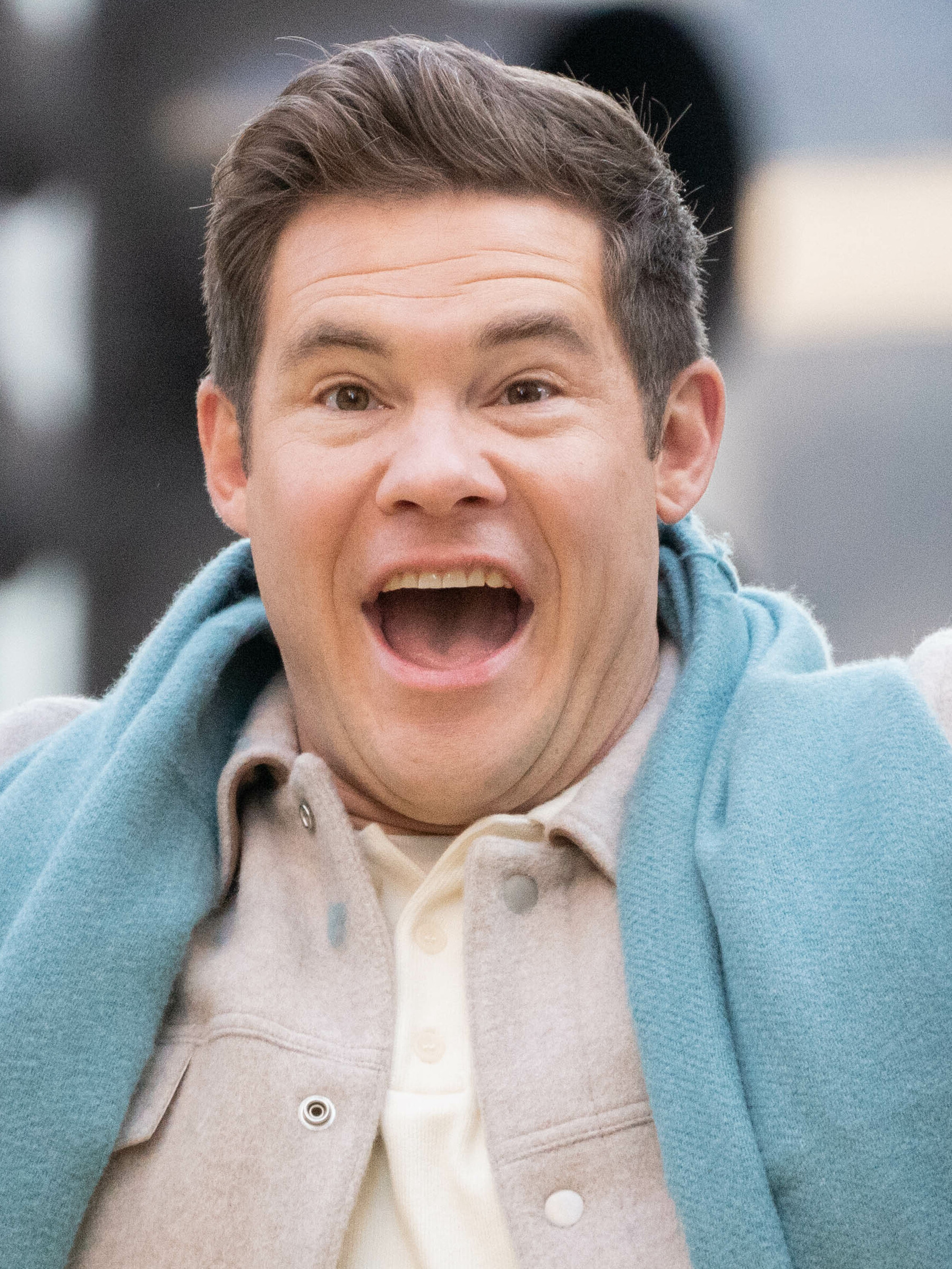
Adam DeVine

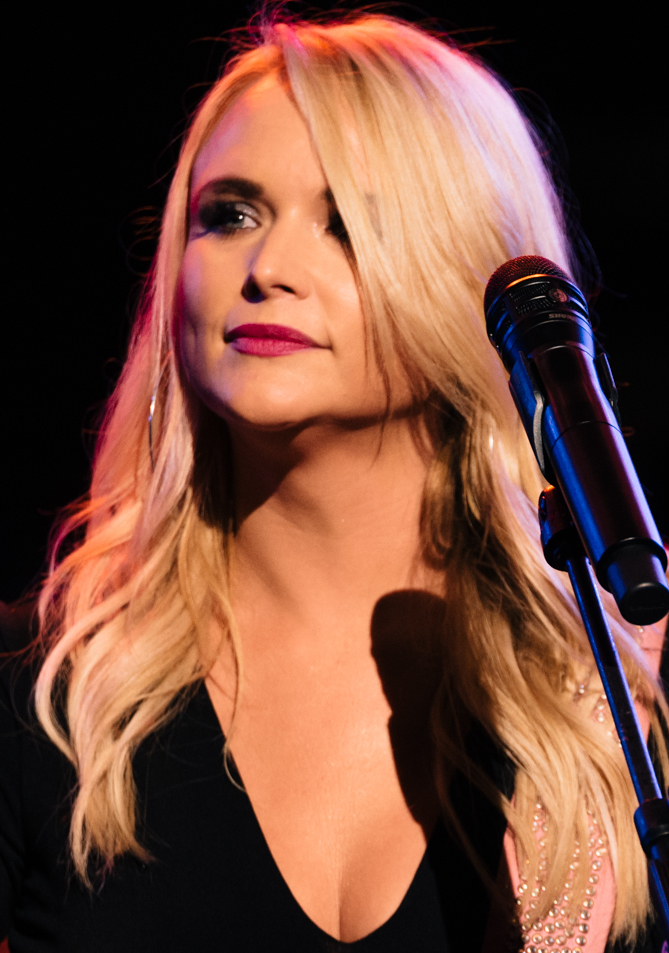
Miranda Lambert

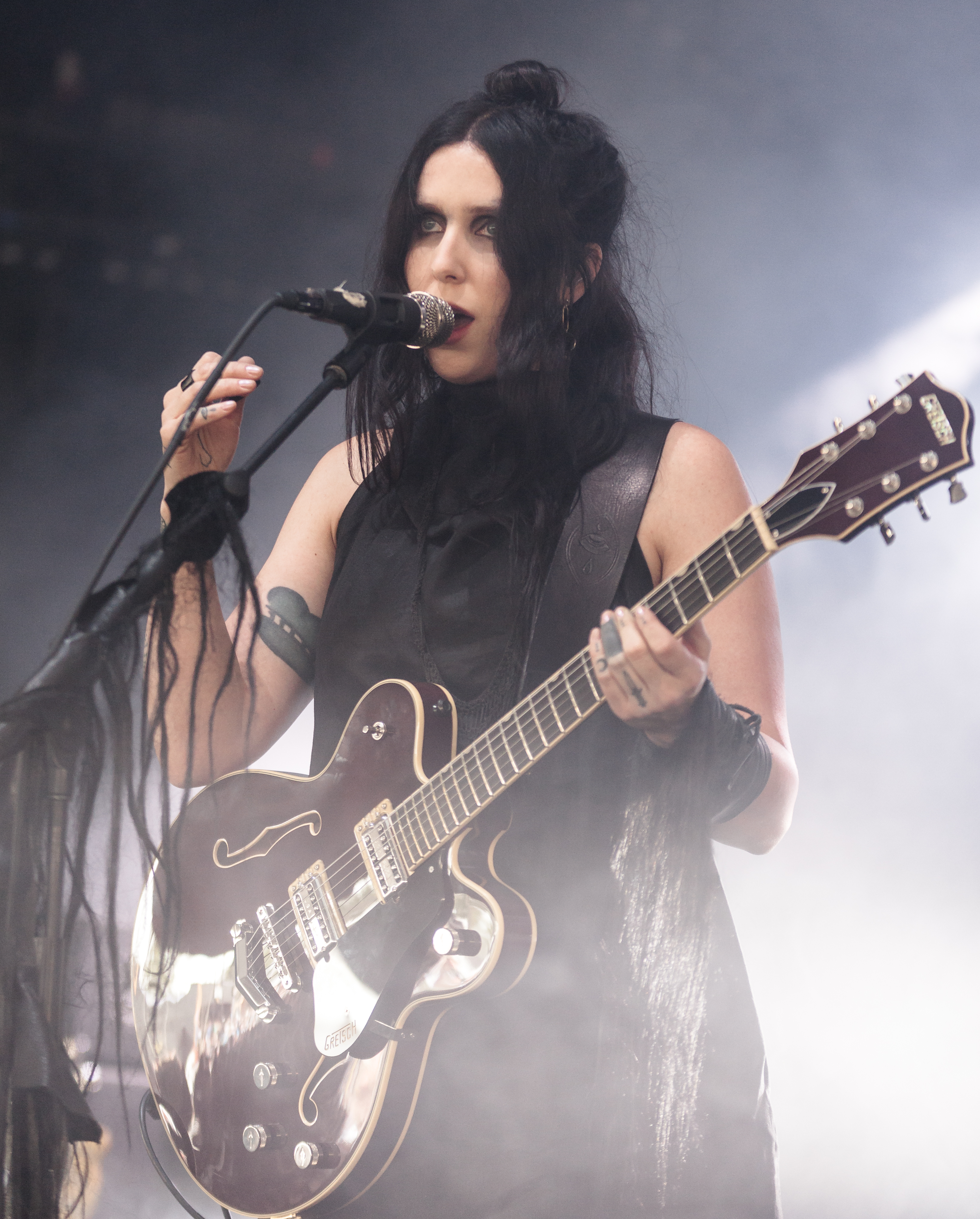
Chelsea Wolfe

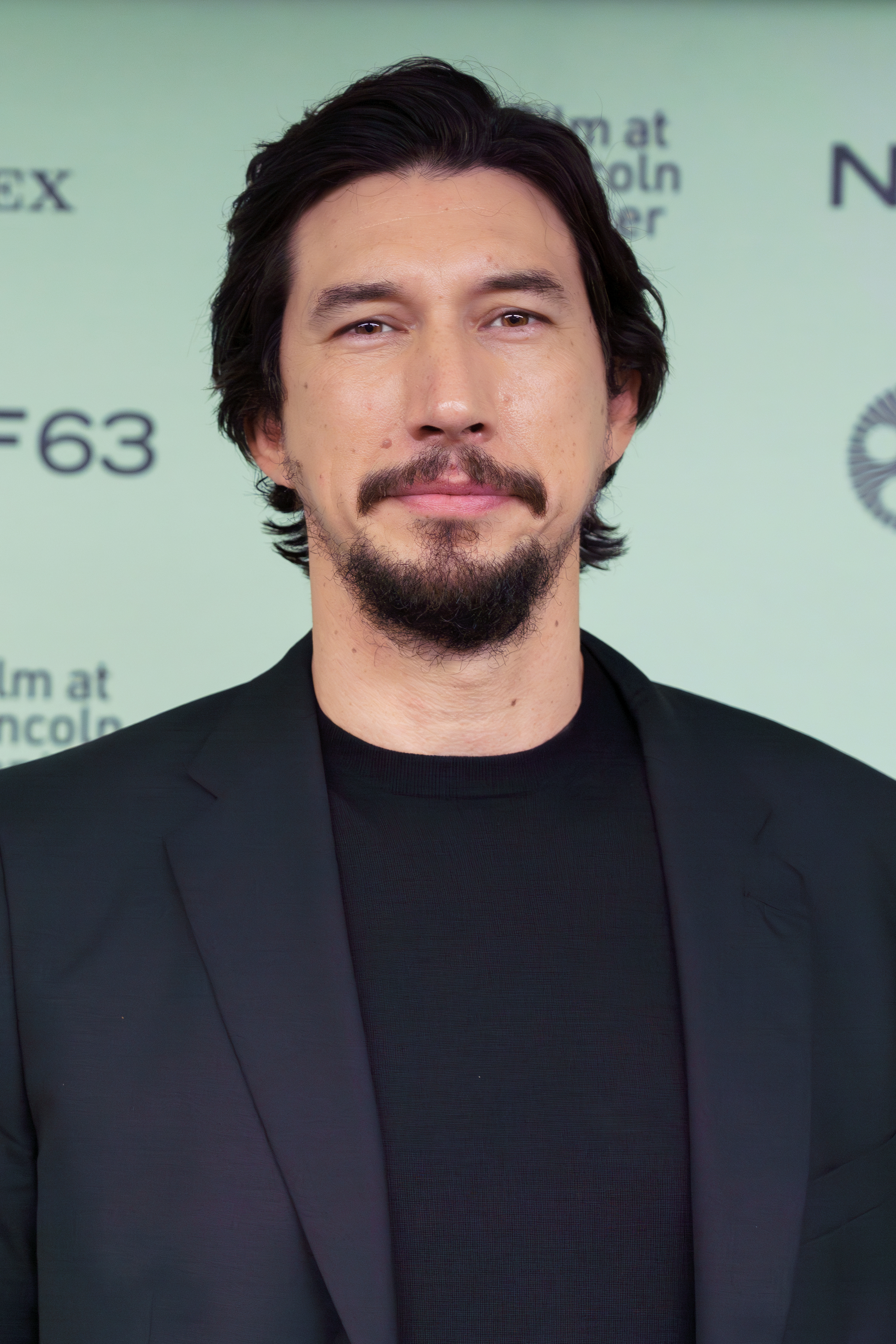
Adam Driver

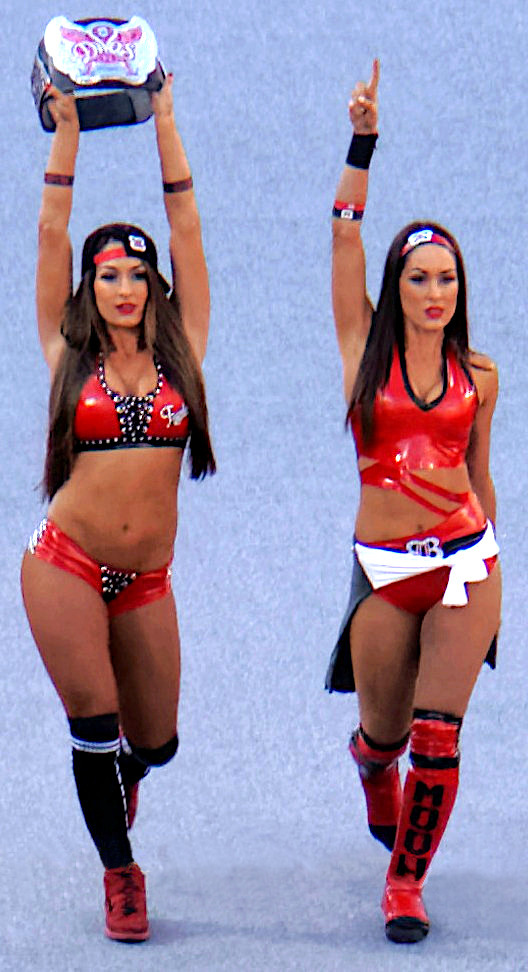
The Bella Twins

- November 2
  - Willie Andrews, football player
  - Fred Rosser, wrestler
- November 3 – Julie Marie Berman, actress
  - Shanya Rose, actress and singer
- November 7
  - Adam DeVine, actor, voice actor, comedian, screenwriter, producer, and singer
  - Forrest Kline, singer/songwriter, guitarist, and frontman for Hellogoodbye
  - Zach Myers, guitarist for Shinedown and frontman for The Fairwell
- November 8
  - Kathleen Bertko, Olympic rower
  - Lucky Cannon, wrestler
  - Joey Gibson, political activist, founder of Patriot Prayer
- November 9
  - Rashad Anderson, basketball player
  - Tony Barnette, baseball player
  - Natalie Bible', director, screenwriter, editor, and producer
  - Mattie Parker, politician, mayor of Fort Worth, Texas (2021–present)
  - Ted Potter, golfer
- November 10
  - Karim Amer, producer and director
  - Miranda Lambert, country singer
- November 11
  - Nick Ahrens, designer and art director
  - Kristal Marshall, wrestler, model, and beauty queen
- November 13 – Nick Albertson, artist
- November 14 – Chelsea Wolfe, singer/songwriter and musician
- November 15 – Tramaine Billie, football player
- November 16 – Benson Henderson, mixed martial artist
- November 17
  - Ryan Bradley, figure skater
  - Ryan Braun, baseball player
  - Shannan Click, model
  - Nick Markakis, baseball player
  - Patrick McHale, animator
  - Christopher Paolini, author
  - Rocsi, television personality
- November 18 – Frank Scott Jr., politician, mayor of Little Rock, Arkansas
- November 19
  - Varuzhan Akobian, Armenian-born chess grandmaster
  - Adam Driver, actor
  - DeAngelo Hall, football player
- November 20
  - Andy Alleman, football player
  - Future, rapper and singer/songwriter
- November 21 – The Bella Twins, (Brie & Nikki), wrestling duo
- November 22
  - Lawson Aschenbach, racing driver
  - Corey Beaulieu, guitarist for Trivium
  - Tyler Hilton, singer/songwriter and actor
  - Andrew J. West, actor
- November 23 – Wes Bankston, baseball player
- November 24
  - Adam22, YouTuber and podcaster
  - DJ Skee, DJ and producer
  - Quentin Williams, politician (d. 2023)
- November 25
  - Jason Wisdom, singer, bassist, and frontman for Becoming the Archetype
  - Joey Chestnut, American competitive hot dog eater
- November 26 – Chris Hughes, businessman and entrepreneur
- November 27
  - Jason Berken, baseball player
  - Arjay Smith, actor
  - Donta Smith, basketball player
  - Marco Thomas, football player
- November 28
  - Tyler Glenn, singer/songwriter and frontman for Neon Trees
  - Danielle Moinet, wrestler and model
- November 29
  - Pamela Brown, CNN justice correspondent
  - Jenn Sterger, television personality and model
- November 30
  - Chad Ackerman, rock singer/songwriter, musician, writer, director, actor, and producer
  - Jermaine Allen, English-born football player
  - CJ Gibson, actress and model
  - Nicholas Kole, figure skater

=== December ===
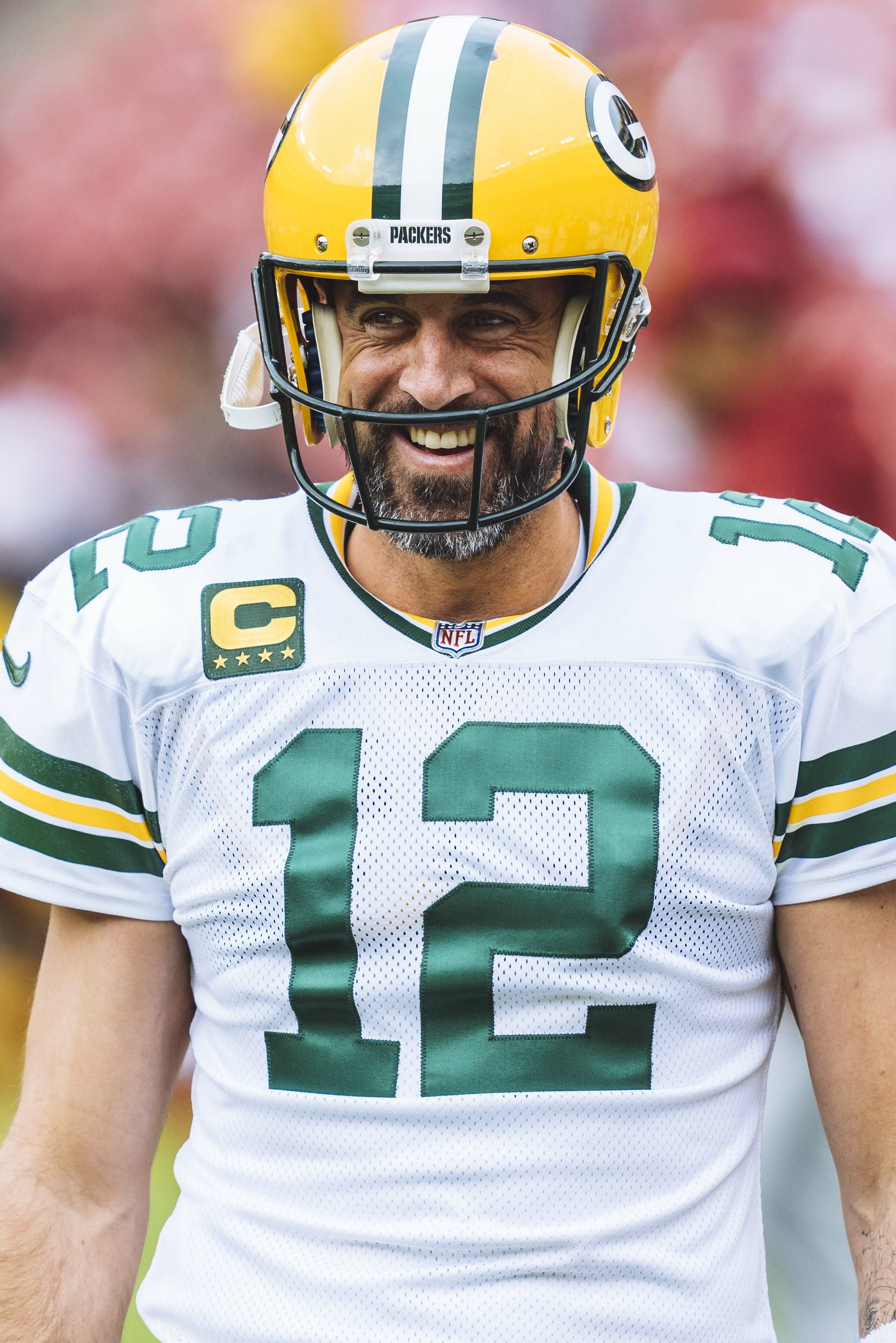
Aaron Rodgers

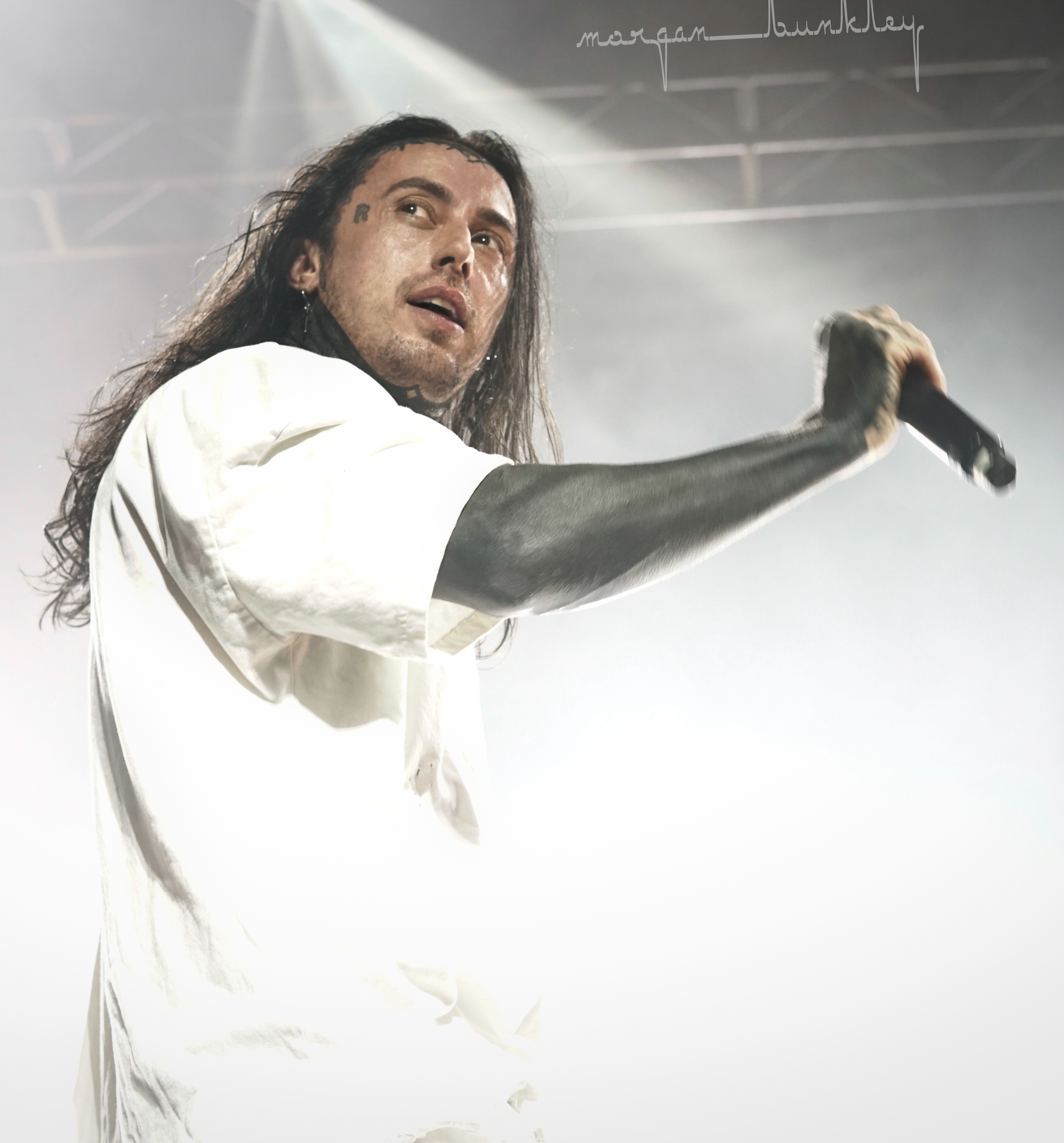
Ronnie Radke

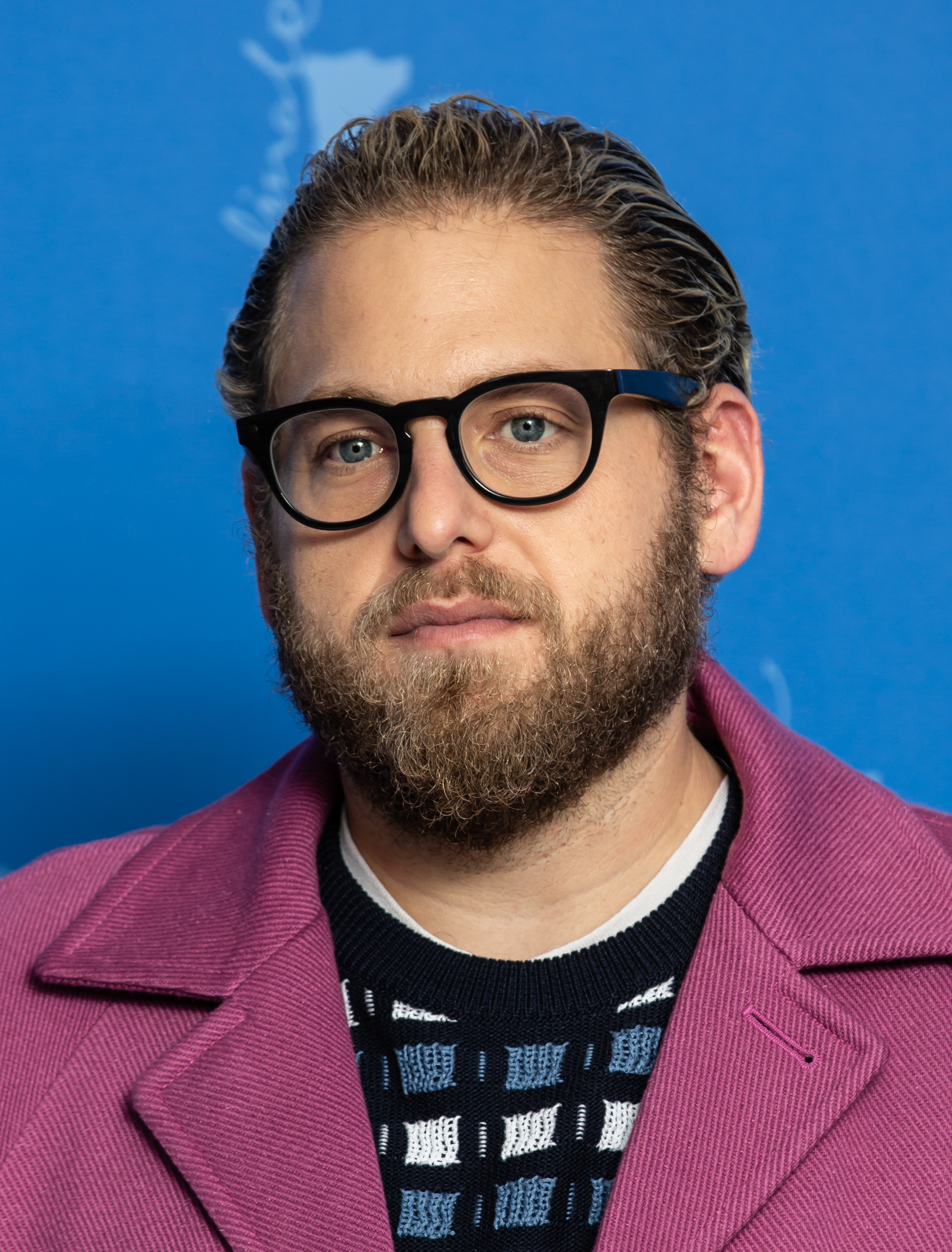
Jonah Hill

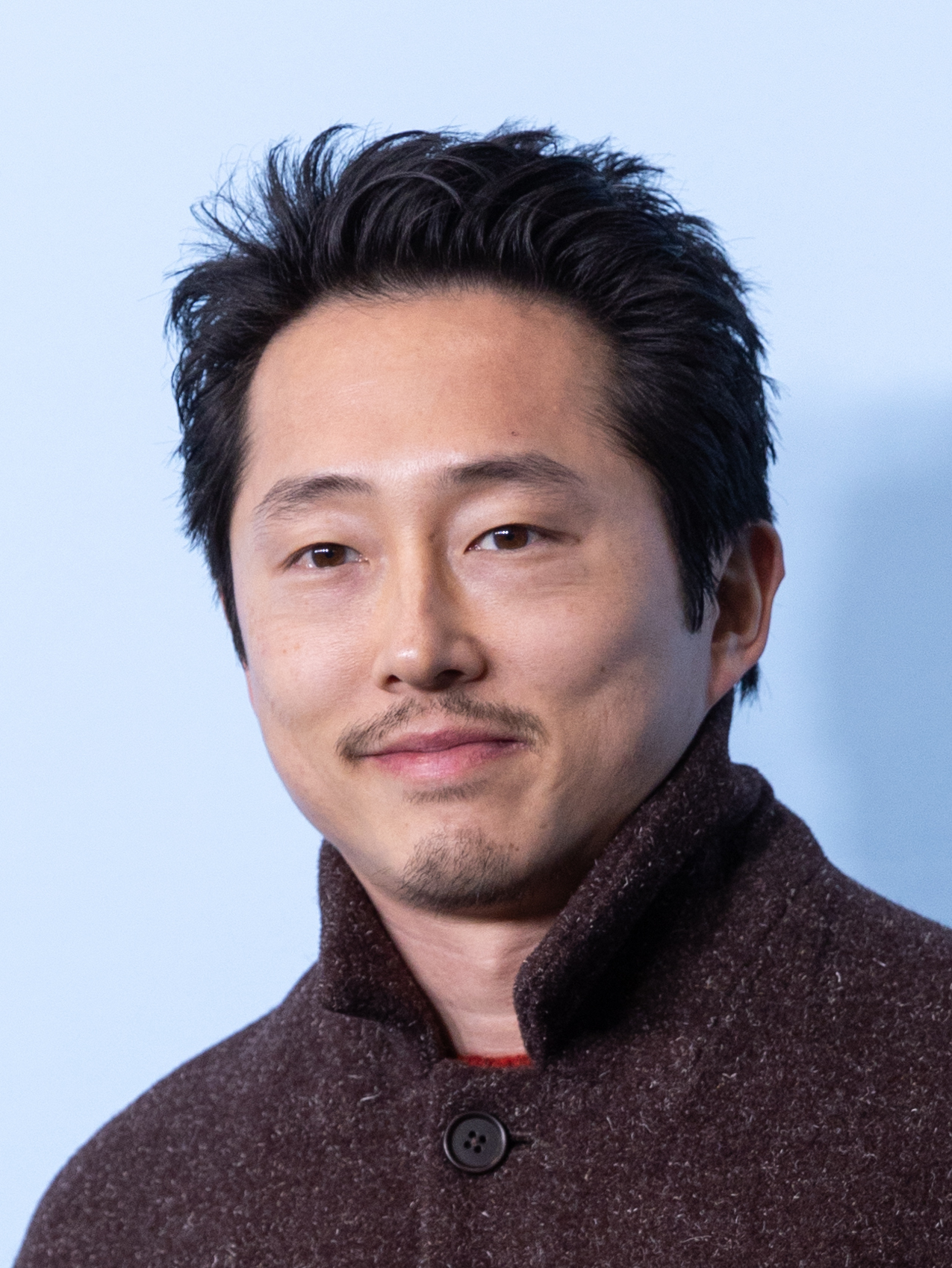
Steven Yeun

- December 1 – Noelle Bassi, swimmer
- December 2
  - Yahya al-Bahrumi, terrorist (d. 2017)
  - Mistie Bass, basketball player
  - Action Bronson, rapper, chef and television presenter
  - Jana Kramer, actress
  - Aaron Rodgers, football player
  - Daniela Ruah, actress
- December 3 – Troy Bergeron, football player
- December 7 – Kenney Bertz, soccer player
- December 8
  - Utkarsh Ambudkar, actor, rapper, and singer
  - Ana Victoria, singer/songwriter, dancer, and record producer
- December 10
  - Ashley Bouder, ballerina
  - Patrick Flueger, actor
- December 13 – Satya Bhabha, English-born acor
- December 15
  - Tanner Ainge, businessman and politician
  - Ronnie Radke, singer/songwriter, rapper, and frontman for Falling in Reverse
- December 16
  - Kelenna Azubuike, English-born basketball player
  - Brandon Beal, singer/songwriter and producer
- December 17 – John Cholish, mixed martial artist
- December 18
  - Melissa Arnot, mountaineer
  - Ady Barkan, lawyer and political activist (d. 2023)
- December 19
  - Mark Baumer, writer, adventurer, and environmental activist (d. 2017)
  - Casey Crescenzo, singer/songwriter and guitarist for The Dear Hunter and The Receiving End of Sirens
  - AJ Lamas, actor
- December 20
  - Gia Allemand, actress, model, and reality television contestant (d. 2013)
  - Justin Blalock, football player
  - Jonah Hill, actor
  - Josh Sussman, actor
- December 21
  - Taylor Teagarden, baseball player
  - Steven Yeun, South Korean-born actor
- December 22 – Doc Gallows, wrestler
- December 23 – Hoa Nguyen, politician (d. 2025)
- December 27 – Cole Hamels, baseball player
- December 29
  - Jessica Andrews, country singer
  - Noah Watts, actor and singer
- December 30
  - Ashley Zukerman, Australian-born actor
  - Kaitlyn Robrock, voice actress
- December 31 – Fred Bennett, football player

=== Full date unknown ===
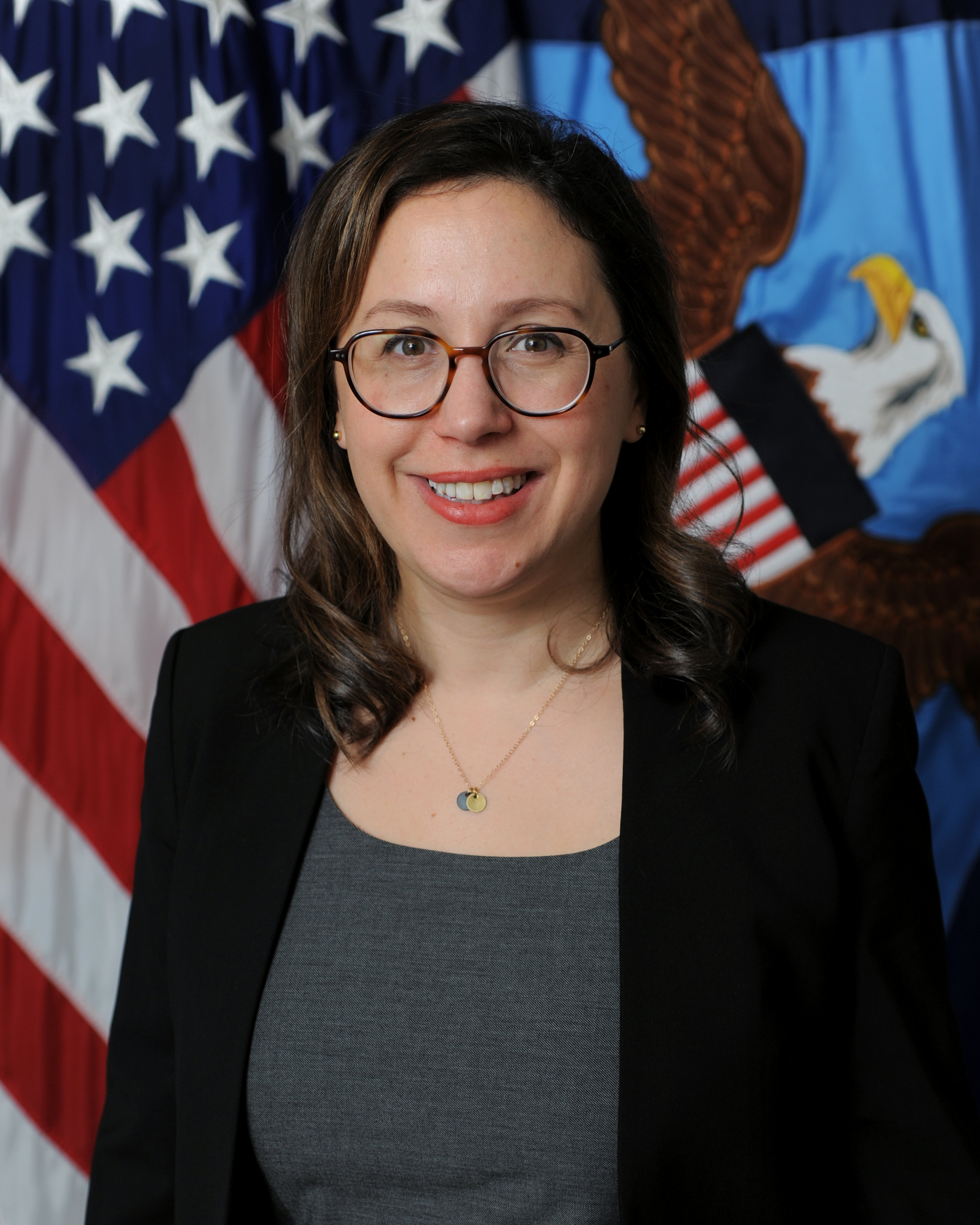
Sasha Baker

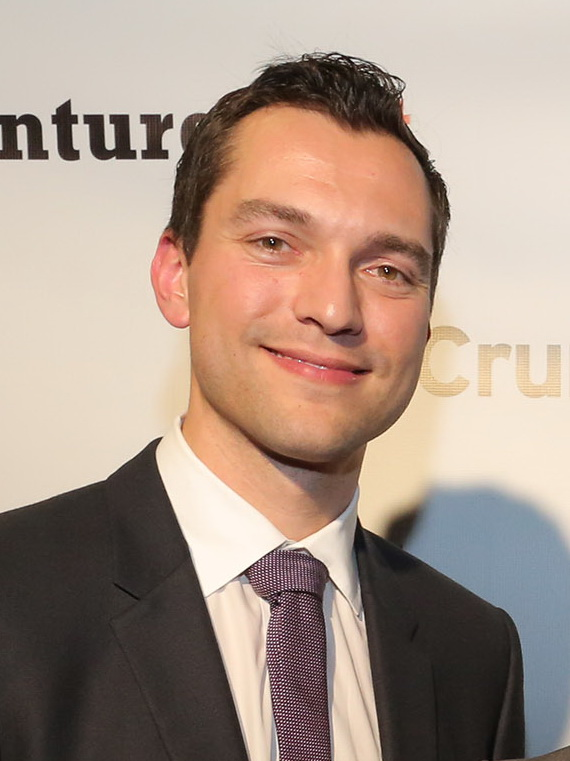
Nathan Blecharczyk

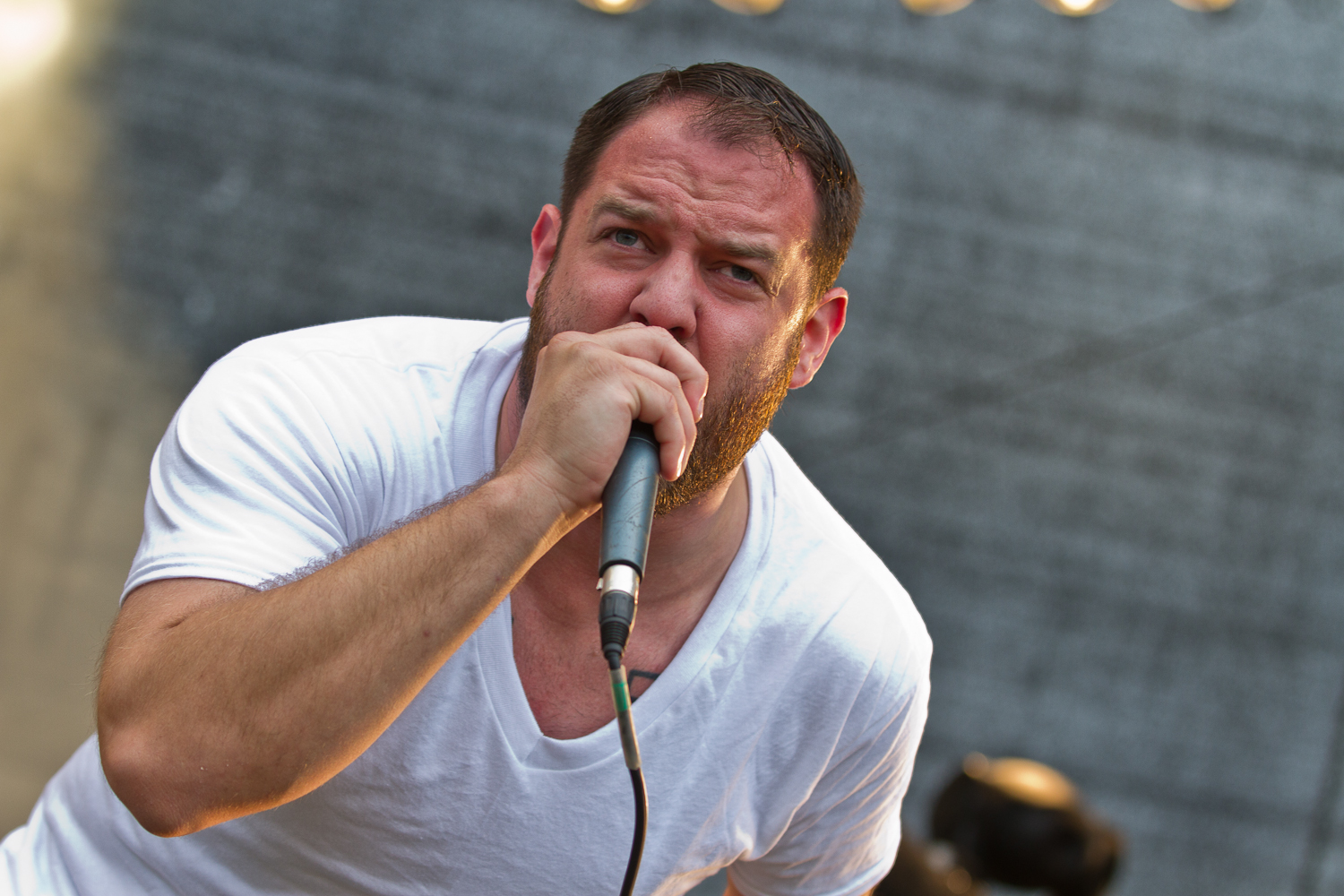
Mat Bruso

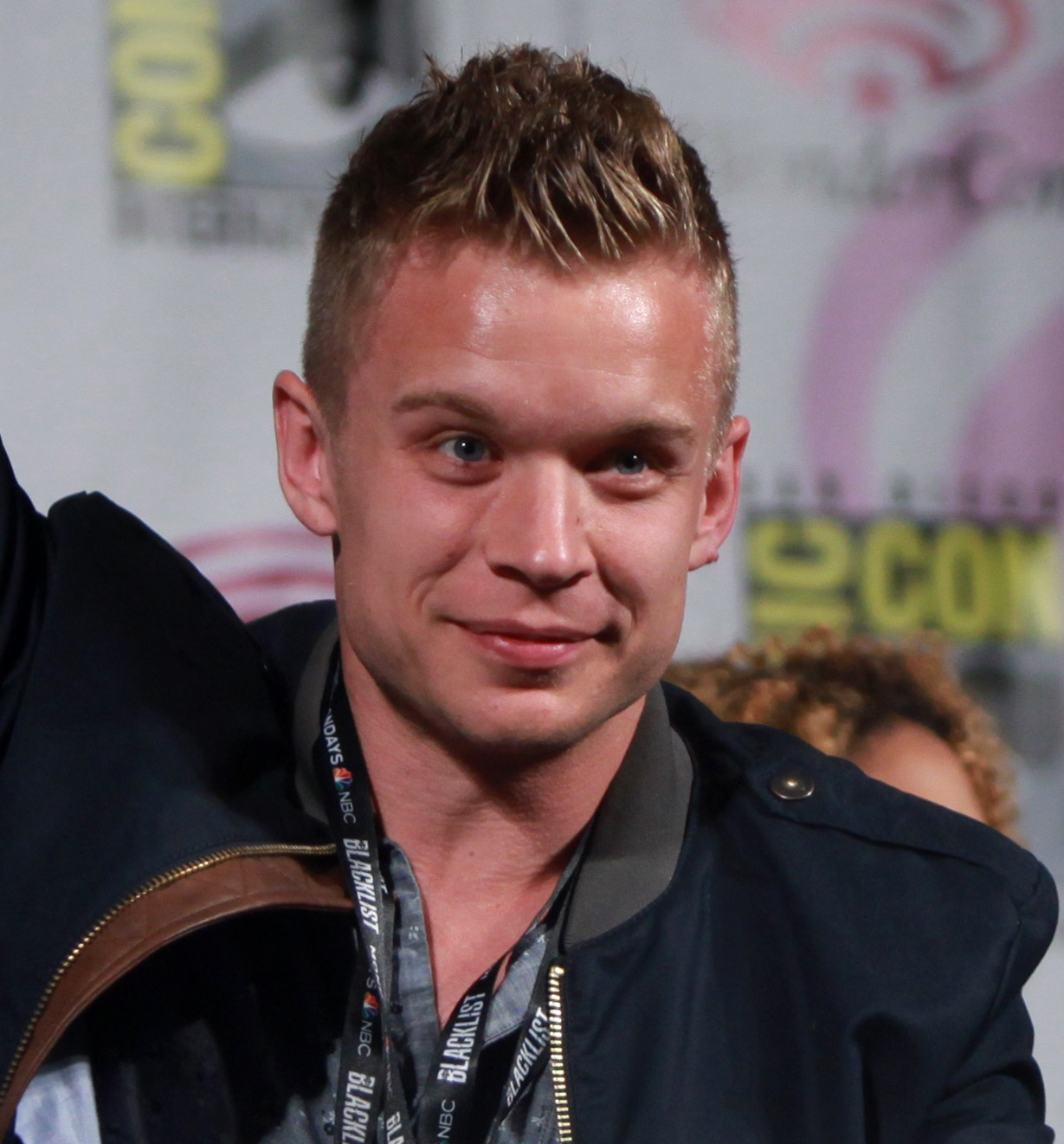
Jesse Luken

- Roma Agrawal, Indian-born British-American structural engineer
- Apryl A. Alexander, forensic psychologist and college professor
- Lucy Alibar, screenwriter and playwright
- Joseph Altuzarra, French-born designer
- Kyle Patrick Alvarez, director and screenwriter
- Phil America, artist
- Celia Ammerman, fashion model
- Evan Amos, video gaming photographer
- Lucia Aniello, Italian-born director, writer, and producer
- Nava Applebaum, Israeli-born murder victim of a Palestinian suicide bombing (d. 2003)
- Alexander Assefa, politician
- Baiyu, Chinese-born singer/songwriter and actress
- Jordan Baker-Caldwell, artist
- Sasha Baker, policy advisor, political scientist, and United States National Security Council staffer
- Nathan Ball, mechanical engineer, entrepreneur, TV host, children's author, pole vaulter, and beatboxer
- Morgan Bassichis, comedian and writer
- Eleanor Bauer, choreographer and dancer
- Alexandra Bell, artist
- Rebecca Bennett, brewmaster
- Liz Berry, politician
- Adam Bilzerian, American-born Nevisian poker player and writer
- Blak Jak, rapper
- Charles Blake, politician
- Nathan Blecharczyk, businessman and co-founder of Airbnb
- Benjamin Boas, author, translator, and contemporary Japanese culture consultant
- Kyle Boddy, baseball coach and trainer
- Aluel James Bol, Sudanese-born pilot
- Gregory Bonsignore, playwright, novelist, and actor
- Zachary Booth, actor
- Mat Bruso, singer and frontman for Bury Your Dead (2003-2007/2011-2024)
- Katie Button, chef and restaurateur
- Matt Deis, bassist for CKY and All That Remains
- Danny Dias, television personality (d. 2017)
- Jesse Luken, actor
- Ashley Austin Morris, actress
- Joe Musten, metalcore singer and drummer
- Eli Ostreicher, British-born entrepreneur (d. 2023)
- Brook Roberts, television personality and beauty pageant winner
- Anita Sarkeesian, Canadian-born feminist

== Deaths ==
- January 2 – Edward Howard, Roman Catholic prelate and venerable (b. 1877)
- January 7 – Fred Church, actor (b. 1889)
- January 8
  - Tom McCall, journalist and politician, 30th Governor of Oregon (b. 1913)
  - Gale Page, radio and screen actress (b. 1910)
- January 10 – Roy DeMeo, Mafia hitman (b. 1942)
- January 16 – Doodles Weaver, actor, comedian, musician (b. 1911)
- January 24 – George Cukor, film director and producer (b. 1899)
- January 26 – Bear Bryant, American football coach (b. 1913)
- February 4
  - Jim Ameche, actor (b. 1915)
  - Karen Carpenter, pop singer and drummer (b. 1950)
- February 6 – Eben Bartlett, army officer and politician (b. 1912)
- February 11 – Max Ehrlich, writer (b. 1909)
- February 12 – Eubie Blake, pianist and composer (b. 1887)
- February 19 – William C. Boyd, immunochemist (b. 1903)
- February 24 – Roy Krenkel, illustrator (b. 1918)
- February 25 – Tennessee Williams, playwright and screenwriter (b. 1911)
- March 3 – Peter Ivers, musician (b. 1946)
- March 11 – Will Glickman, playwright (b. 1910)
- March 16 – Arthur Godfrey, radio personality and entertainer (b. 1903)
- March 18 – Catherine Marshall, author (b. 1914)
- March 27 – Elsie Eaves, civil engineer (b. 1898)
- April 4 – Gloria Swanson, actress (b. 1899)
- April 15 – John Engstead, photographer and journalist (b. 1909)
- April 17 – Felix Pappalardi, music producer and musician (b. 1939)
- April 21 – Walter Slezak, Austrian-born actor (b. 1902)
- April 22 – Earl Hines, jazz pianist and bandleader (b. 1903)
- April 23 – Buster Crabbe, Olympic swimmer and actor (b. 1908)
- April 26
  - Henrietta Buckmaster, activist, journalist and author (b. 1909)
  - Vaughn Taylor, actor (b. 1910)
- April 30
  - George Balanchine, ballet dancer and choreographer (b. 1904 in Russia)
  - Joel Henry Hildebrand, physical chemist (b. 1881)
  - Muddy Waters, blues singer-songwriter (b. 1915)
- May 1 – Arthur Dewey Struble, admiral (b. 1894)
- May 8 – John Fante, writer (b. 1909)
- May 31 – Jack Dempsey, boxer (b. 1895)
- June 1 – Ernest Graves, actor (b. 1919)
- June 6 – James E. Casey, businessman and founder of UPS (b. 1888)
- June 10 – Larry Hooper, singer and musician (b. 1917)
- June 12 – Norma Shearer, Canadian-born actress (b. 1902 in Canada)
- June 23 – Glen Harmeson, American football player and coach (b. 1908)
- June 24 – William E. Miller, politician, Republican vice-presidential candidate in 1964 U.S. presidential election (b. 1914)
- June 30 – Len Jordan, U.S. Senator from Idaho from 1962 to 1973 (b. 1899)
- July 1 – Buckminster Fuller, architect (b. 1895)
- July 5 – Harry James, musician and bandleader (b. 1916)
- July 7 – Vicki Morgan, mistress to Alfred S. Bloomingdale (b. 1952)
- July 18 – Alex Radcliffe, baseball player (b. 1905)
- July 20 – Frank Reynolds, television journalist (b. 1923)
- July 29 – Raymond Massey, Canadian actor (b. 1896)
- July 30 – Lynn Fontanne, English actress (b. 1887)
- August 3
  - Carolyn Jones, actress (b. 1930)
  - Jobriath, musician and actor (b. 1946)
- August 6 – Klaus Nomi, German singer (b. 1944)
- August 7 – David Ford, actor (b. 1925)
- August 13 – Bob Bailey, actor (b. 1913)
- August 17 – Ira Gershwin, lyricist (b. 1896)
- August 26 – Mike Kellin, actor (b. 1922)
- August 27
  - Harry A. deButts, railroad executive
  - Bobby Griffith, suicide (b. 1963)
- August 29 – Simon Oakland, actor (b. 1915)
- September 1
  - Otto Hulett, actor (b. 1898)
  - Henry M. Jackson, U.S. Senator from Washington from 1953 to 1983 (b. 1912)
  - Larry McDonald, U.S. Representative from Georgia from 1975 to 1983 (b. 1935)
- September 2 – Toni Mannix, actress and dancer (b. 1906)
- September 12 – Sabin Carr, pole vaulter, Olympic champion (1928) (b. 1904)
- September 25 – Paul Jacobs, pianist (b. 1930)
- October 5 – Earl Tupper, businessman and inventor (b. 1907)
- October 7 – George O. Abell, astronomer, professor at UCLA, science popularizer, and skeptic (b. 1927)
- October 8
  - Joan Hackett, actress (b. 1934)
  - Edward Woods, actor (b. 1903)
- October 12 – Ernie Roth, wrestling manager (b. 1926)
- October 14 – Paul Fix, actor (b. 1901)
- October 15 – Pat O' Brien, actor (b. 1899)
- October 16 – George Liberace, musician and television performer (b. 1911)
- October 18 – Willie Jones, baseball player (b. 1925)
- October 20 – Merle Travis, country musician (b. 1917)
- October 23 – Jessica Savitch, journalist (b. 1947)
- October 28 – Otto Messmer, cartoonist (b. 1892)
- October 30 – Lillian Gordy Carter, nurse and mother of Jimmy Carter (b. 1898)
- November 8 – Robert Agnew, actor (b. 1899)
- November 13 – Junior Samples, comedian (b. 1926)
- November 22 – Michael Conrad, actor (b. 1925)
- November 28 – Christopher George, actor (b. 1931)
- December 5 – Robert Aldrich, film director, producer, screenwriter (b. 1918)
- December 8 – Slim Pickens, actor and rodeo performer (b. 1919)
- December 21 – Rod Cameron, actor (b. 1910)
- December 27 –Walter Scott, performer (b. 1943)
- December 28
  - William Demarest (b. 1892)
  - Dennis Wilson, musician (b. 1944)

== See also ==
- 1983 in American television
- List of American films of 1983
- Timeline of United States history (1970–1989)
