= Jordan (surname) =

Surname list

Jordan is a surname of Christian and Hebrew origin.

The form found in Western names originates from Hebrew: ירדן, romanized: Yarden, relating to the Jordan River in West Asia. According to the New Testament of the Bible, John the Baptist baptised Jesus Christ in the Jordan and during the Crusades, crusaders and pilgrims would bring back some of the river water in containers to use in the baptism of their own children in Europe and Britain. It thus became popular as a first name. Jordanes, a 6th-century Gothic historian, may have popularised the name as well.

It may refer to:

== People ==
=== A ===
- Abel Jordán (born 2003), Spanish sprinter
- Absalom Jordan (1840–1888), American soldier
- Adalberto Jordan (born 1961), American lawyer and judge
- Ademar Jordan (fl. 1198–1212), French knight and troubadour
- Adolphe Jordan (1845–1900), Swiss politician
- Adonis Jordan (born 1970), American basketball player
- Adrienne Jordan (born 1994), American soccer player
- Agnes Jordan (before 1520–1546), English Catholic abbess
- Akeem Jordan (born 1985), American football player
- Akeem Jordan (cricketer) (born 1994), West Indian cricketer
- Albert Jordan (1821–1872), American architect
- Alex Jordan (born 1990), English actor
- Alex Jordan Jr. (1914–1989), American architect
- Alexander Jordan (born 1981), German politician
- Alexis Jordan (disambiguation), multiple people
- Alfonso Jordan (1103–1148), French noble
- Alfred Jordan (disambiguation), multiple people
- Alice Mabel Jordan (1870–1960), American librarian
- Alistar Jordan (1949–2025), New Zealand cricketer
- Allan Jordan (1898–1982), Australian painter
- Alma Jordan, Irish social entrepreneur
- Alphonso Jordan (born 1987), American triple jumper
- Álvaro Jordan (1962–2001), Colombian tennis player
- Ambrose L. Jordan (1789–1865), American lawyer and newspaper editor
- Amos Jordan (1922–2018), American military officer
- Amy Jordan (disambiguation), multiple people
- Andre Jordan, British artist
- Andre Jordan Jr. (born 2005), American football player
- Andrew Jordan (disambiguation), multiple people
- Angel G. Jordan (1930–2017), Spanish-American computer engineer
- Angelina Jordan (born 2006), Norwegian singer-songwriter
- Anique Jordan, Canadian artist
- Anita Jordán (1917–1946), Argentinian actress
- Ann Jordan (born 1934), American social worker
- Anna Jordan (born 1979), English playwright
- Anne Duk Hee Jordan (born 1978), Korean-German artist
- Anthony Jordan (disambiguation), multiple people
- Antoine Jordan (born 1983), American basketball player
- Antony Jordan (born 1974), American football player
- Armin Jordan (1932–2006), Swiss conductor
- Artishia Wilkerson Jordan (1901–1974), American educator
- Auguste Jordan (1909–1990), French footballer
- Augustin Jordan (1910–2004), French soldier and diplomat
- A. Van Jordan (born 1965), American poet
- Ayana Jordan, American addiction psychiatrist

=== B ===
- Barbara Jordan (disambiguation), multiple people
- Barry Jordan, American neurologist
- Ben Jordan (boxer) (1873–1945), British boxer
- Ben Jordan (bull rider) (1931–2022), American bull rider
- Benn Jordan (born 1979), American musician
- Bernadette Jordan (born 1963), Canadian politician
- Bernard Jordan (1924–2014), British naval officer
- B. Everett Jordan (1896–1974), American politician
- Bill Jordan (disambiguation), multiple people
- Billy Jordan (died 2000), Irish footballer
- Bob Jordan (disambiguation), multiple people
- Bobbi Jordan (1937–2012), American actress
- Bobby Jordan (1923–1965), American actor
- Boris Jordan (born 1966), Russian-American businessman
- Blaze Jordan (born 2002), American baseball player
- Brandon Jordan (gridiron football) (born 1988), American football player
- Brenna Jordan (born 1999), American YouTuber
- Brent Jordan (born 1963), American writer and strip-club bouncer
- Brevin Jordan (born 2000), American football player
- Brian Jordan (disambiguation), multiple people
- Bridgette Jordan (1989–2019), American dwarf
- Brigitte Jordan (1937–2016), German-American anthropologist
- Bryan Jordan (born 1985), American soccer player
- Bryce Jordan (1924–2016), American academic administrator
- Buck Jordan (1907–1993), American baseball player
- Buford Jordan (born 1962), American football player

=== C ===
- Caelum Jordan (born 2002), English rugby league footballer
- Cameron Jordan (born 1989), American football player
- Cameron Jordan (rugby union) (born 1999), English rugby union footballer
- Camille Jordan (1838–1922), French mathematician
- Camille Jordan (politician) (1771–1821), French politician
- Carl Jordan (disambiguation), multiple people
- Carole Jordan (1941–2026), British physicist and academic
- Caroline Jordan (born 1964), British field hockey player
- Carrie Thomas Jordan (1870–1968), American educator and activist
- Casey Jordan (1968–2018), American fitness instructor
- Catheleen Jordan (born 1947), American professor of social work
- Catherine Jordan (born 1974), British Royal Navy commodore
- Cathy Jordan (born 1972), Irish singer-songwriter
- Charles Jordan (disambiguation), multiple people
- Charles-Étienne Jordan (1700–1745), French civil servant
- Charley Jordan (1890–1954), American singer-songwriter
- Charlotte Jordan (born 1994), English actress
- Chester B. Jordan (1839–1914), American teacher and politician
- Chris Jordan (disambiguation), multiple people
- Christina Jordan (born 1962), British politician
- Chuck Jordan (disambiguation), multiple people
- Clarence Jordan (1912–1969), American farmer and theologian
- Clarrie Jordan (1922–1992), English footballer
- Claude Thomas Alexis Jordan (1847–1897), French botanist and taxonomist
- Claudia Jordan (born 1973), American radio show host
- Claudia J. Jordan (born 1953), American judge
- Clifford Jordan (1931–1993), American musician
- C. Mark Jordan, American automotive designer
- Colin Jordan (1923–2009), British activist
- Colin Everett Jordan, Barbadian politician
- Conrad N. Jordan (1830–1903), American banker
- Corey Jordan (born 1999), English footballer
- Cornelia J. M. Jordan (1830–1898), American poet
- Cornelius T. Jordan (1855–1924), American educator and politician
- Cortez Jordan (1921–1982), West Indian cricketer
- Cortney Jordan (born 1991), American Paralympic swimmer
- Crystal Jordan, American writer
- Curtis Jordan (born 1954), American football player
- Cyril Jordan (born 1948), American guitarist

=== D ===
- Dakota Jordan (born 2003), American baseball player
- Daniel Jordan (disambiguation), multiple people
- Darin Jordan (born 1964), American football player
- Daphne Jordan (born 1959), American politician
- David Jordan (disambiguation), multiple people
- Davy Jordan (1908–2006), Irish footballer
- Dax Jordan (fl. 2001–present), American actor
- DeAndre Jordan (born 1988), American basketball player
- Deirdre Jordan (1926–2026), Australian academic, university administrator and nun
- Denis Jordan (1914–1982), Australian chemist
- Diane-Louise Jordan (born 1960), British television presenter
- Dillon D. Jordan, American film producer
- Dion Jordan (born 1990), American football player
- D. J. Jordan, American academic administrator
- Dock J. Jordan (1866–1943), American lawyer and activist
- Don Jordan (1934–1997), American boxer
- Donald Jordan (born 1962), American football player
- Donna Jordan (born 1950), American actress
- Doris Jordan (table tennis) (1911–1986), English table tennis player
- Dorothea Jordan (1761–1816), Irish actress
- Dorothy Jordan (American actress) (1906–1988), American actress
- Duke Jordan (1922–2006), American pianist
- Dulcina Mason Jordan (1833–1895), American poet
- Dutch Jordan (1880–1972), American baseball player
- Dylan Jordan (baseball) (born 2005), American baseball player
- Dylan C. Jordan (born 1994), American politician

=== E ===
- Eason Jordan (born 1960), American entrepreneur
- Eben Dyer Jordan (1822–1895), American business executive
- E. Bernard Jordan (born 1959), American preacher
- Ed Jordan (born 1969), South African musician
- Eddie Jordan (disambiguation), multiple people
- Éder Jordan (born 1985), Bolivian footballer
- Edmond Jordan (born 1971), American attorney and politician
- Edouardo Jordan (born 1980), American restauranteur
- Edward Jordan (disambiguation), multiple people
- Edwin O. Jordan (1866–1936), American bacteriologist and public health scientist
- Eithne Jordan (born 1954), Irish painter
- Elder Jordan (1850–1936), American businessman and philanthropist
- Eleanor Jordan (born 1953), American politician
- Elisabeth Jordán (born 1983), Spanish actress
- Elise Jordan (born 1983), American journalist
- Elizabeth Jordan (1865–1947), American journalist and activist
- Elizabeth Jordan (cyclist) (born 1997), British cyclist
- Ellington Jordan (1940–2020), American musician
- Elliott Jordan (born 1983), English actor
- Emily Jordan (born 1984), American politician
- Emma Jordan, Northern Irish actress
- Emmerson Jordan (born 1959), Barbadian cricketer
- Epalla Jordan (born 1981), Cameroonian footballer
- Ernst Jordan (1883–1948), German footballer
- Ernst Jordan (painter) (1858–1924), German painter
- Ervin L. Jordan Jr. (born 1954), American archivist
- Ethan Jordan (born 2002), Canadian football player

=== F ===
- Federico Jordan (born 1969), Mexican artist
- Francisco Jordán (1886–1921), Spanish carpenter and activist
- Frank Jordan (disambiguation), multiple people
- Frankie Jordan (1938–2025), French musician
- Fred Jordan (disambiguation), multiple people
- Frederick Jordan (1881–1949), Australian judge
- F. W. Jordan (1881–1941), British physicist

=== G ===
- Gary Jordan (??–2018), English rugby league footballer
- George Jordan (disambiguation), multiple people
- Gerald Jordan (born 1939), American businessman
- Gerard Jordan, Northern Irish actor
- Gilbert Paul Jordan (1931–2006), Canadian criminal
- Gina Jordan (1929–2013), Canadian pilot and missionary
- Glenn Jordan (born 1936), American television director
- Grace Jordan (1892–1985), American author
- Grant Jordan (born 1965), Australian cricketer
- Greg Jordan (born 1990), American soccer player
- Gregor Jordan (born 1966), Australian film director
- Gregory Paul Jordan (died 1921), British doctor

=== H ===
- Hamilton Jordan (1944–2008), American political advisor
- Hans Jordan (1892–1975), German World War II general
- Harold Jordan (1915–2001), Barbadian cricketer
- Harrison Jordan (1804–1871), American politician
- Harry Jordan (1873–1920), American baseball player
- Hartwell Jordan (born 1961), American sailor
- Harvey E. Jordan (1878–1963), American professor
- Heinrich Ernst Karl Jordan (1861–1959), German entomologist
- Hen Jordan (1894–1948), American baseball player
- Henri Jordan (1833–1886), German scholar
- Henry Jordan (disambiguation), multiple people
- Henryk Jordan (1842–1907), Polish physician
- Herb Jordan (1884–1973), Canadian ice hockey player
- Hermann Jordan (1808–1887), German scientist
- Hillary Jordan (born 1963), American writer
- Homer Jordan (born 1960), American football player
- Hortense Allen Jordan (1919–2008), American dancer
- Howard Jordan (police officer) (born 1966), American police officer
- Howard Jordan Jr. (1916–1986), American academic administrator
- Hugh S. Jordan (1921–2016), American politician

=== I ===
- Ian Jordan (1927–1993), Guyanese cricketer
- I. King Jordan (born 1943), American educator
- Irene Jordan (1919–2016), American singer
- Isaac M. Jordan (1835–1890), American politician and lawyer
- Isamu Jordan (1975–2013), American journalist

=== J ===
- Jack Jordan (disambiguation), multiple people
- Jacob Jordan (1741–1796), English businessman and politician
- Jacob Jordan (soldier) (1770–1829), English businessman and politician
- Jacquie Jordan, American television producer
- Jade Jordan (born 1988), Irish actress
- James Jordan (disambiguation), multiple people
- Janice Jordan (born 1964), American activist
- Jared Jordan (born 1984), American basketball player
- Jason Jordan (born 1988), American professional wrestler
- Jason Jordan (soccer) (born 1978), Canadian soccer player
- Jawhar Jordan (born 1999), American football player
- Jay Jordan (disambiguation), multiple people
- Jeanne Jordan, American filmmaker
- Jeff Jordan (disambiguation), multiple people
- Jeffrey Jordan (born 1988), American basketball player
- Jen Jordan (born 1974), American lawyer and politician
- Jenny Johnson Jordan (born 1973), American beach volleyball player
- Jeremiah Jordan (1830–1911), Irish politician
- Jeremy Jordan (disambiguation), multiple people
- Jerome Jordan (born 1986), Jamaican basketball player
- Jerry Jordan (born 1941), American political advisor
- Jessica Jordan (born 1984), Bolivian-British politician and model
- Jessie Jordan (1887–1954), Scottish hairdresser
- Jim Jordan (disambiguation), multiple people
- Jimmy Jordan (disambiguation), multiple people
- Jo Jordan (born 1962), American politician
- Joan Jordán (born 1994), Spanish footballer
- Joanna Jordan (disambiguation), multiple people
- Joanne Jordan (1920–2009), American actress
- Joe Jordan (born 1951), Scottish footballer
- Johann Christoph Jordan (??–1748), German writer and historian
- John Jordan (disambiguation), multiple people
- Johnny Jordan (1921–2016), English footballer
- Johnny Jordan (rugby league) (1906–1957), English rugby league footballer
- Jonathan Jordan (born 1968), American politician
- Joseph Jordan (disambiguation), multiple people
- Joy Jordan (born 1935), British middle-distance runner
- Judith V. Jordan, American psychologist
- Judy Jordan (born 1961), American poet
- Jules Jordan (born 1972), American adult film actor
- Jules Jordan (composer) (1850–1927), American composer
- Julia Jordan, American playwright
- Julian Jordan (born 1995), Dutch disc jockey
- Julian Jordan (composer) (1850–1929), American composer
- Juliet Jordan (born 1956), English-Australian actress
- Julius Jordan (1877–1945), German archaeologist
- June Jordan (1936–2002), American poet and activist
- Justin Jordan (born 1978), American comic writer

=== K ===
- Karen Jordán (born 1989), Panamanian model
- Karina Jordán (born 1985), Peruvian actress
- Karl Jordan (disambiguation), multiple people
- Kat Jordan (born 2002), American soccer player
- Kate Jordan (1862–1926), Irish-American novelist
- Kathleen Jordan, American television writer
- Kathy Jordan (born 1959), American tennis player
- Keith Jordan (born 1950), American politician
- Kelani Jordan (born 1998), American professional wrestler
- Ken Jordan (disambiguation), multiple people
- Kenneth D. Jordan, American chemist
- Kent A. Jordan (born 1957), American judge
- Keryn Jordan (1975–2013), South African footballer
- Keven Jordan, Canadian singer
- Kevin Jordan (disambiguation), multiple people
- Kidd Jordan (1935–2023), American saxophonist
- Kinsley Jordan (born 1984), American politician
- Kip Jordan, American soccer player
- Klaus-Günter Jordan (1940–2011), German rower
- Kris Jordan (1977–2023), American politician
- Kristin Richardson Jordan (born 1987), American politician
- Kyle Jordan (born 1988), English footballer

=== L ===
- Lamar Jordan (born 1994), American football player
- LaMont Jordan (born 1978), American football player
- Lance Jordan, American disc jockey
- Larnie Jordan (1914–1987), American baseball player
- Larry Jordan (disambiguation), multiple people
- LaToya Jordan, American author
- Laura Jordan (actress) (born 1977), Canadian actress
- LaVall Jordan (born 1979), American basketball coach
- Leander Jordan (born 1977), American football player
- Lee Roy Jordan (1941–2025), American football player
- Leighton Jordan (born 1992), American beauty pageant contestant
- Len Jordan (1899–1983), American politician
- Len Jordan (rugby league) (1920–2014), New Zealand rugby league footballer
- Lena Jordan (1880/1881–?), Russian gymnast
- Leo Jordan (1929–2015), Canadian politician
- Leon Jordan (1905–1970), American politician
- Les Jordan (1896–1965), Australian politician
- Leslie Jordan (1955–2022), American actor
- Levi Jordan (born 1995), American baseball player
- Lewis Garnett Jordan, American missionary
- Liam Jordan (born 1998), South African soccer player
- Lino Jordan (1944–2023), Italian biathlete
- Lioneld Jordan (born 1953), American politician
- Lloyd Jordan (1900–1990), American athletics administrator
- Lois Jordan (1883–1949), American businesswoman
- Lonnie Jordan (born 1948), American musician
- Lorna Jordan (1954–2021), American artist
- Louis Jordan (1908–1975), American musician
- Louis Jordan (American football) (1890–1918), American football player
- Louisa Jordan (1878–1915), Scottish nurse
- Louise Jordan (disambiguation), multiple people
- Luke Jordan (1892/1893–1952), American musician
- Luke Jordan (footballer) (born 1998), English footballer
- Luna Jordan (2000–2026), German actress
- Luther Jordan (1950–2002), American politician
- Lydia Jordan (born 1994), American actress
- Lynda Marie Jordan (born 1956), American biochemist

=== M ===
- Mack A. Jordan (1928–1951), American soldier
- Manuel Jordan (1853–1919), Puerto Rican painter
- Marc Jordan (born 1948), American-Canadian singer-songwriter
- Marcus Jordan (born 1990), American basketball player
- Marian Driscoll Jordan (1898–1961), American actress
- Marisa Jordan (born 2000), American soccer player
- Mark Jordan (disambiguation), multiple people
- Marko Jordan (born 1990), Croatian footballer
- Marlon Jordan (born 1970), American musician
- Martyn Jordan (1865–1902), English rugby union footballer
- Mary Jordan (disambiguation), multiple people
- Maryanne Jordan (born 1956), American politician
- Matt Jordan (born 1975), American soccer player and executive
- Matthew Jordan (born 1996), English golfer
- Max Jordan (1895–1977), German-American journalist
- Mayra Jordán (born 1994), Panamanian footballer
- Meg Jordan (born 1950), American anthropologist
- Mic Jordan, Native American rapper
- Michael Jordan (disambiguation), multiple people
  - Michael Jordan (born 1963), American basketball player
- Michal Jordán (born 1990), Czech ice hockey player
- Mildred Jordan (1901–1982), American playwright
- Mildred M. Jordan (died 1965), American medical librarian
- Milt Jordan (1927–1993), American baseball player
- Miriam Jordan (1904–1987), British actress
- Montana Jordan (born 2003), American actor
- Montell Jordan (born 1968), American singer-songwriter and record producer
- Mosina H. Jordan (born 1943), American lawyer and diplomat

=== N ===
- Nancy C. Jordan, American educator
- Neil Jordan (born 1950), Irish filmmaker
- Neville Jordan (born 1943), New Zealand engineer
- Nick Jordan (disambiguation), multiple people
- Nicole Jordan (born 1954), American author
- Niles Jordan (1925–2008), American baseball player
- Norm Jordan (1888–1966), Australian rules footballer
- Norman Jordan (1888–1937), British cricketer

=== O ===
- Ola Jordan (born 1982), Polish-British dancer
- Olivia Jordan (born 1988), American actress and model
- Olivia Jordan (interpreter) (1919–2021), British driver and interpreter
- Omari Jordan (born 1978), American football player
- Orchid I. Jordan (1910–1995), American politician
- Orestes Jordán (1913–1991), Peruvian footballer
- Orlando Jordan (born 1974), American professional wrestler
- Oswald Jordan (1912–1991), American politician

=== P ===
- Pallo Jordan (born 1942), South African politician
- Pascual Jordan (1902–1980), German theoretical and mathematical physicist
- Pat Jordan (1928–2001), British politician
- Pat Jordan (author) (born 1941), American sports writer
- Patricia Jordan (1930–1997), Canadian nurse and politician
- Patrick Jordan (1923–2020), British actor
- Patrick W. Jordan (born 1967), British-American writer
- Patty Jordan (born 1959), American golfer
- Paul Jordan (disambiguation), multiple people
- Paula Jordan (1889–1941), German art dealer
- Paulette Jordan (born 1979), American politician
- Payton Jordan (1917–2009), American athletics coach
- Pearse Jordan (1969–1992), Irish soldier
- Pearson Jordan (1950–2020), Barbadian sprinter
- Penny Jordan (1946–2011), English writer
- Peter Jordan (disambiguation), multiple people
- Philip Jordan (born 1980), Irish Gaelic footballer
- Philipp Jordan (born 1974), German artist
- Philippe Jordan (born 1974), Swiss conductor
- Praveen Jordan (born 1993), Indonesian badminton player

=== R ===
- Rachel Jordan (born 1968), British artist
- Raimon Jordan (1178–1195), Italian troubadour
- Ralph Jordan (1910–1980), American football coach
- Randy Jordan (born 1970), American football coach
- Rashaan Jordan (born 1971), American football coach
- Ray Jordan (born 1994), West Indian cricketer
- Raymond Jordan (disambiguation), multiple people
- Reggie Jordan (born 1968), American basketball player
- Rex Jordan (born 1968), American indigenous politician
- Rhoda Jordan (born 1979), American actress
- Ric Jordan (born 1950), Canadian ice hockey player
- Ricardo Jordan (born 1970), American baseball player
- Ricardo López Jordán (1822–1889), Argentinean politician and military official
- Richard Jordan (disambiguation), multiple people
- Rip Jordan (1889–1960), American baseball player
- Rita Jordan, English psychologist and autism researcher
- Robert Jordan (disambiguation), multiple people
- Roberto Jordán (born 1943), Mexican singer
- Rochelle Jordan (born 1989), Jamaican-British singer
- Rodrigo Jordan (born 1959), Chilean businessman
- Roger Jordan (born 1972), Barbadian sprinter
- Roland C. Jordan (born 1938), American musical composer
- Romana Jordan (born 1966), Slovenian politician
- Ronny Jordan (born 1962), British musician
- Rory Jordan (born 2000), Australian soccer player
- Roy Jordan (born 1978), English footballer
- Rudolf Jordan (disambiguation), multiple people
- Rufus King Jordan (1863–1942), American politician and businessman
- Russell C. Jordan Jr. (1926–2012), American politician
- Ruth Jordan (1902–1996), American schoolteacher

=== S ===
- Saffron Jordan (born 1993), English footballer
- Samuel Jordan (??–1623), American planter
- Samuel M. Jordan (1871–1952), American missionary
- Sandra Jordan, American author
- Sara Murray Jordan (1884–1959), American gastroenterologist
- Sari Jordan (born 1999/2000), American singer-songwriter
- Sass Jordan (born 1962), English-Canadian singer
- Savannah Jordan (born 1995), American soccer player
- Scott Jordan (disambiguation), multiple people
- Sean D. Jordan (born 1965), American judge
- Shane Jordan, English chef
- Sharon Jordan (born 1960), American actress
- Shaun Jordan (born 1968), American swimmer
- Sheila Jordan (1928–2025), American singer–songwriter
- Shelby Jordan (1952–2022), American football player
- Shelia Jordan, Irish politician
- Sherryl Jordan (1949–2023), New Zealand writer
- Sid Jordan (1889–1970), American actor
- Sid Jordan (broadcaster) (1877–1971), Australian broadcaster
- Simon Jordan (born 1967), English businessman
- Slats Jordan (1878–1953), American baseball player
- Stan Jordan (born 1937), American military officer and politician
- Stanley Jordan (born 1959), American guitarist
- Stephen Jordan (disambiguation), multiple people
- Steve Jordan (disambiguation), multiple people
- Susan Jordan (born 1947), New Zealand dancer
- Suzette Jordan (1974–2015), Indian activist
- Sverre Jordan (1889–1972), Norwegian composer
- Sydney Jordan (born 1928), Scottish artist
- Sydney Jordan (politician) (born 1990), American politician
- Sylvester Jordan (1792–1861), German politician and lawyer

=== T ===
- Taft Jordan (1915–1981), American musician
- Tamás Jordán (born 1943), Hungarian actor
- Taylor Jordan (born 1989), American baseball player
- Ted Jordan (1924–2005), American actor
- Tenita Jordan (1960–2018), American singer-songwriter
- Teresa Jordan (born 1953), American geologist
- Terry Jordan (disambiguation), multiple people
- Thierry Jordan (born 1943), French prelate
- Thomas Jordan (disambiguation), multiple people
- Thomasina Jordan (1929–1999), American activist
- Tim Jordan (disambiguation), multiple people
- Tina Marie Jordan (born 1972), American model and actress
- T. J. Jordan (born 1986), American basketball player
- Todd Jordan (born 1970), American football player
- Tom Jordan (disambiguation), multiple people
- Tommy Jordan, Irish Gaelic football manager
- Toni Jordan (born 1966), Australian novelist
- Tony Jordan (disambiguation), multiple people
- Tuajuanda C. Jordan, American academic administrator
- Ty Jordan (2001–2020), American football player

=== V ===
- V. Craig Jordan (1947–2024), British–American pharmacologist
- Vernon Jordan (1935–2021), American lawyer and business executive
- Vi Jordan (1913–1982), Australian politician
- Víctor Hugo Arévalo Jordán (born 1946), Bolivian writer and professor

=== W ===
- Walter Jordan (born 1956), American basketball player
- Walter Jordan (rower) (1904–1997), Australian rower
- Walter Irvine Jordan (1902–1947), American soldier
- Waymond Jordan (born 2003), American football player
- Wilbur Kitchener Jordan (1902–1980), American historian
- Wilhelm Jordan (disambiguation), multiple people
- Will Jordan (1927–2018), American actor
- William Jordan (disambiguation), multiple people
- Willie Jordan (1885–1949), English footballer
- Willy Otto Jordan (1920–2019), Brazilian swimmer
- Wilmar Jordán (born 1990), Colombian footballer
- Winifred Jordan (1920–2019), English athlete
- Winston Jordan (born 1954), Guyanese politician
- Winthrop D. Jordan (1931–2007), American historian

=== Y ===
- Yashira Jordán (born 1985), Bolivian director

=== Z ===
- Zane Jordan (born 1991), Zambian swimmer
- Zoe Jordan, Irish fashion designer

== Fictional characters ==
- Hal Jordan, in the comic book series Green Lantern
- Tracy Jordan, in the television series 30 Rock

== See also ==
- Jordan (given name), people with the given name
- General Jordan (disambiguation)
- Governor Jordan (disambiguation)
- Judge Jordan (disambiguation)
- Justice Jordan (disambiguation)
- Senator Jordan (disambiguation)
