= The Marriage Ref (American TV series) =

Television series

- Genre: Reality, Panel game
- Created by: Jerry Seinfeld
- Presented by: Tom Papa
- Narrated by: Marv Albert
- Country of origin: United States
- Original language: English
- No. of seasons: 2
- No. of episodes: 22

Production
- Producer: Jerry Seinfeld
- Running time: 60 minutes
- Production companies: Columbus 81 Productions; Ellen Rakieten Entertainment (season 1); Shed Media (season 1); Universal Media Studios (season 2)

Original release
- Network: NBC
- Release: February 28, 2010 – August 28, 2011

The Marriage Ref is an American reality television series and panel game hosted by comedian Tom Papa and produced by Jerry Seinfeld, in which a rotating group of celebrities decides the winners of real-life marital disputes. The show premiered on NBC on Sunday, February 28, 2010 on the final night of the Olympics before moving to Thursdays. The show's second season debuted on June 26, 2011.

On May 13, 2012, NBC cancelled the series after two seasons.

== Premise ==
The premise of the show involves real-life couples who have been having an ongoing argument. In season one, a video clip was shown to a three-member celebrity panel depicting both sides of a dispute. The celebrities made humorous observations, deliberated the merits and voted on who should win the debate. Though the Marriage Ref (Papa) took their votes into consideration, he was free to make his own decision about who was right.

In addition to the celebrity panel, season one featured a fact checker who could provide additional information to aid in the decision making. Today correspondents Natalie Morales and Maria Menounos and MSNBC's Mika Brzezinski filled this role.

Changes were announced for season two. Couples would appear live in studio, and at the end of each show, the studio audience would vote on which of the night's three winners was "The Rightest." The winner received $25,000 and a billboard in their hometown declaring that they were right.

Reviewers have described the show as a renewal of the panel game format popular in classic American television.

== Production ==
The Marriage Ref was originally scheduled to premiere Sunday, March 14 at 8 pm, as the lead-in to The Celebrity Apprentice. NBC greenlighted the show "within minutes" of Seinfeld pitching the concept. However, as a result of The Jay Leno Show being cancelled, the premiere was moved up to Thursday, March 4 at 10 pm, as one of its replacement shows.

The executive producers of The Marriage Ref were Jerry Seinfeld, Ellen Rakieten, Nick Emerson, Jennifer O'Connell, and Al Berman. Seinfeld selected comedian Tom Papa, his longtime warm-up act, to serve as the show's host and referee. The program was produced by Seinfeld's company, Columbus 81 Productions. Endemol provided services of international distribution of The Marriage Ref. Central Talent Booking managed the composition of each show's celebrity panel.

== Episodes ==
=== Season 1 (2010) ===
No.	Title	Directed by	Written by	Original release date
1	"Preview"	Beth McCarthy-Miller	Jeff Cesario, Chuck Martin, and Tom Papa	February 28, 2010
Celebrity Panel: Alec Baldwin, Kelly Ripa, Jerry Seinfeld
2	"Episode Two"	Beth McCarthy-Miller	Jeff Cesario, Chuck Martin, and Tom Papa	March 4, 2010
Celebrity Panel: Tina Fey, Jerry Seinfeld, Eva Longoria
3	"Episode Three"	Unknown	Unknown	March 11, 2010
Celebrity Panel: Larry David, Madonna, Ricky Gervais
4	"Episode Four"	Unknown	Unknown	March 18, 2010
Celebrity Panel: Cedric the Entertainer, Martha Stewart, Jason Alexander
5	"Episode Five"	Unknown	Unknown	March 25, 2010
Celebrity Panel: Alec Baldwin, Kelly Ripa, Jerry Seinfeld
6	"Episode Six"	Unknown	Unknown	April 1, 2010
Celebrity Panel: Kirstie Alley, Jimmy Fallon, Sheryl Crow
7	"Episode Seven"	Unknown	Unknown	April 8, 2010
Celebrity Panel: Nathan Lane, Kathy Griffin, Tracy Morgan
8	"Episode Eight"	Unknown	Unknown	April 22, 2010
Celebrity Panel: Donald Trump, Gloria Estefan, Adam Carolla
9	"Episode Nine"	Unknown	Unknown	April 29, 2010
Celebrity Panel: Martin Short, Sarah Silverman, Matthew Broderick
10	"Episode Ten"	Unknown	Unknown	May 6, 2010
Celebrity Panel: Jerry Seinfeld, Gwyneth Paltrow, Greg Giraldo
11	"Episode Eleven"	Unknown	Unknown	May 13, 2010
Celebrity Panel: Howie Mandel, Bette Midler, Craig Robinson
12	"Episode Twelve"	Unknown	Unknown	May 20, 2010
Celebrity Panel: Demi Moore, Jim Breuer, Kelly Ripa

=== Season 2 (2011) ===
No.	Title	Directed by	Written by	Original release date
13	"Episode 13"	Unknown	Unknown	June 26, 2011
Celebrity Panel: Jerry Seinfeld, Julianne Moore, Ricky Gervais
14	"Episode 14"	Unknown	Unknown	July 3, 2011
Celebrity Panel: Tracy Morgan, Susie Essman, Regis Philbin
15	"Episode 15"	Unknown	Unknown	July 10, 2011
Celebrity Panel: Kathy Griffin, Ellen Pompeo, Brian Regan
16	"Episode 16"	Unknown	Unknown	July 17, 2011
Celebrity Panel: Seth Meyers, Denise Richards, George Wallace
17	"Episode 17"	Unknown	Unknown	July 24, 2011
Celebrity Panel: Lauren Graham, Colin Quinn, Mary J. Blige
18	"Episode 18"	Unknown	Unknown	July 31, 2011
Celebrity Panel: Rachael Ray, Larry Miller, J.B. Smoove
19	"Episode 19"	Unknown	Unknown	August 7, 2011
Celebrity Panel: Cedric the Entertainer, Rachel Dratch, Joel McHale
20	"Episode 20"	Unknown	Unknown	August 14, 2011
Celebrity Panel: Judah Friedlander, Ali Wentworth, will.i.am
21	"Episode 21"	Unknown	Unknown	August 21, 2011
Celebrity Panel: Nick Cannon, Caroline Rhea, Jim Breuer
22	"Episode 22"	Unknown	Unknown	August 28, 2011
Celebrity Panel: Bill Maher, Patti LaBelle, Ali Wentworth

== Critical reception ==
=== Reviews ===
The Marriage Ref received an overwhelmingly negative reception from television critics. It currently receives a 41 out of 100 on Metacritic based on 11 reviews. According to the news agency, Reuters, the television program received "scathing reviews". An analysis of reviews in The Guardian noted that The Marriage Ref, "has been so thoroughly panned by critics its future looks in doubt even before it begins." Linda Holmes of National Public Radio called the show "painfully bad" and commented, "I was optimistic that I'd be writing something of the 'Don't assume this show is terrible' variety. But it's ... terrible." The newspaper The Star Ledger described it as "heinous", and called it an "ugly, unfunny, patronizing mess". The New York Times called the show "funny, despite a cheesy game show premise". A review by Entertainment Weekly called the program "silly fun", and commented, "The Marriage Ref exists to permit the celebrity judges to comment amusingly on the cases to be adjudicated." An analysis in Variety magazine characterized the program as "a breezy, inexpensive approach to comedy that brought to mind the panel shows of yesteryear". The Wall Street Journal characterized the show as a "panel" form of game show, commenting, "The concept is essentially a re-jiggering of a genre staple of television's halcyon days: the 'panel' game show".

A commentary on the show in Time magazine commented that The Marriage Ref was "the most God-awful mishmash of a comedy-variety show". Time gave it an F, as did The A.V. Club who noted how confused the premise of the show is claiming that the pilot "safely toe[s] the line between all of [its] options and never commit[s] to one of them." A reviewer for TV.com commented, "The Marriage Ref may be the worst television I've seen in awhile [sic]." The review concluded that the program was an "atrocity" and, "a pathetic half-hour that's edited to hell, results in meaningless resolutions, features the worst animated intro of all-time, and is just plain uncomfortable to watch".

"Who knew Seinfeld could be this unfunny?", commented a review in The Baltimore Sun; the review stated that the program was not worthy of its Thursday slot or daytime syndication. The Huffington Post asked a similar question, "How could a man as funny as Seinfeld produce such a remarkably unfunny show?" The website Gawker mused as to whether "Jerry Seinfeld's new show almost cancels out Seinfeld", and IGN wrote, "The Marriage Ref just felt utterly dead on arrival." New York Magazine characterized The Marriage Ref as "kinda terrible". An analysis of the show in The Hartford Courant wrote, "What do you do if you've managed to pull your network up from fourth place after two weeks of highly-rated Olympic Winter games? If you're NBC, you squander it immediately on an unfunny little thing called 'The Marriage Ref.'" The review concluded that "absolutely nothing funny happened", and called the show "about as wrongheaded an offering to prime time as, well, anything on NBC these days"

=== Ratings ===
In the ratings, the program's debut performed worse than the CBS Network television reality show Undercover Boss even with the Olympics closing lead-in. The pre-empting and tape delay of the remainder of the 2010 Winter Olympics closing ceremony after late local news in order to broadcast the premiere of The Marriage Ref was immediately criticized by viewers over social networking websites such as Twitter. The week after its debut, The Marriage Ref dropped to number three in the ratings; losing to the CBS program The Mentalist and the ABC Network program Private Practice. The program had been in first place in its first week, but fell 21 percent in the ratings in its second week. The program saw steady ratings decline with each episode since its debut. The first showing of The Marriage Ref had 14 million viewers, and by the fourth full episode the number of viewers had declined to 6.5 million. As of the fourth episode, the program had "posted its lowest rating to date", with a rating of 2.5/7. In the program's sixth broadcast, the April 8, 2010 edition of The Marriage Ref hit a season low with a rating of 2.1, just three days after it had been renewed for a second season.

The show's second season premiere had ratings 20% lower than the first season premiere, at a 1.6.

== International versions ==
Country	Title	Host	Network	Date aired
(Arab League) Arab World	قاضي الغـرام; Qadi El Gharam	Moustafa Shaban	Abu Dhabi TV	September 20 – December 13, 2010
Argentina	El referí del matrimonio	Gabriel Corrado	Telefe	December 13, 2010 – March 2011
Russia	Семейный приговор Semyeinyi prigovor	Gennady Khazanov	TV3	February 2011
Serbia	Bračni sudija	Sanja Marinković	Pink	September 21, 2011
United Kingdom	The Marriage Ref	Dermot O'Leary	ITV	June 18, 2011
