= Eddie Jack Jordan =

Eddie Jack Jordan may refer to:

- Eddie Jordan (attorney) (born 1952), American attorney
- Eddie Jack Jordan (artist) (1925–1999), African American artist
