= Amy Jordan =

Amy Jordan may refer to:

- Amy B. Jordan (astronomer), American astronomer
- Amy B. Jordan (media investigator) (born 1961), professor of journalism and media studies

== See also ==
- Amy and Jordan, comic book
