= Thomas Jordan =

Thomas Jordan may refer to:

== Sports ==
- Thomas Jordan (basketball) (born 1968), American professional basketball player
- Thomas Jordan (footballer), Barbadian football player and manager
- Thomas Jordan (sprinter) (born 1949), German former sprinter
- Tom Jordan (baseball) (1919–2019), American Major League Baseball catcher
- Tom Jordan (footballer) (born 1981), Scottish semi-professional footballer
- Tom Jordan (rugby union) (born 1998), New Zealand rugby union player
- Tommy Jordan, Gaelic football manager

== Other ==
- Thomas Jordan (economist) (born 1963), Swiss economist and former chairman of the governing board of the Swiss National Bank
- Thomas Jordan (general) (1819–1895), Confederate Army general
- Thomas Jordan (Medal of Honor) (1840–1930), American Civil War sailor and Medal of Honor recipient
- Thomas Jordan (MP), in 1397, MP for Bedford
- Thomas Jordan (mayor), (1880–1945), Mayor of Masterton, New Zealand
- Thomas Jordan (poet) (died 1685), English poet
- Thomas Jordan (Royal Navy officer) (18th century), British naval officer
- Thomas Brown Jordan (1807–1890), British inventor and engineer
- Thomas H. Jordan (born 1948), American geophysicist
- Tom Jordan (actor) (1937-2019), Irish actor

== See also ==
- Jordan (name)
