= Edward Jordan =

Edward or Eddie Jordan may refer to:

== Arts and entertainment ==
- Edward "Kidd" Jordan (1935–2023), American jazz saxophonist
- Eddie Jordan, keyboard player for the band Fiction Factory
- Eddie Jack Jordan (artist) (1925–1999), African American artist
- Ed Jordan (born 1969), South African musician and TV presenter
- Ed Jordan (Doctors), a fictional character from the TV series Doctors

== Others ==
- Edward Jordan (pirate) (1771–1809), Irish rebel, fisherman and pirate in Nova Scotia
- Edward S. Jordan (1882–1958), American entrepreneur, automotive industrialist and pioneer in evocative advertising copy
- Edward Jordan (American lawyer) (1820–1899), Solicitor of the United States Treasury
- Eddie Jordan (1948–2025), Irish founder of defunct Formula One team, Jordan Grand Prix
- Eddie Jordan (basketball) (born 1955), American basketball player and coach
- Eddie Jordan (attorney) (born 1952), former district attorney for Orleans Parish (including the city of New Orleans), Louisiana

== See also ==
- Edward Jordon (1800–1869), Jamaican activist and mayor
