= Mary Jordan =

Mary Jordan may refer to:

- Mary Ann Jordan (?–1966), American murder victim
- Mary Augusta Jordan (1855–1941), American college professor of English literature and rhetoric
- Mary Jordan (journalist) (born 1960), American journalist and Pulitzer Prize winner
- Mary Jordan (filmmaker) (born 1969), American filmmaker, artist, activist, and social justice advocate
- Mary Ranken Jordan (1869–1962), American philanthropist
- Mariangela Giordano (born 1937), Italian actress (English pseudonyme)
