= George Jordan (footballer) =

Scottish footballer

Personal information
- Date of birth: c. 1917
- Place of birth: Scotland
- Date of death: 8 July 1944 (aged 27)
- Place of death: Normandy, France
- Position: Right back

Senior career*
Years	Team	Apps	(Gls)
–1934	Partick Thistle	0	(0)
1934–1938	Kilbirnie Ladeside		
1938–1940	Cowdenbeath	46	(0)
1940	→ St Johnstone (guest)	0	(0)
- * Club domestic league appearances and goals

George Jordan (1917 – 8 July 1944) was a Scottish footballer who played in the Scottish League for Cowdenbeath as a right back.

== Personal life ==
In 1940, early in the Second World War, Jordan enlisted as a private in the Black Watch. He was killed in the Battle of Normandy on 8 July 1944, while serving with the 7th Battalion, part of the 51st (Highland) Division. Jordan was buried in Ranville War Cemetery.

== Career statistics ==
Appearances and goals by club, season and competition
Club	Season	League			Scottish Cup		Total	
Club	Season	Division	Apps	Goals	Apps	Goals	Apps	Goals
Cowdenbeath	1937–38	Scottish Second Division	12	0	2	0	14	0
Cowdenbeath	1938–39	Scottish Second Division	34	0	3	0	37	0
Career total			46	0	5	0	51	0

== Honours ==
Cowdenbeath

- Scottish League Second Division: 1938–39

Individual

- Cowdenbeath Hall of Fame
