= Joanna Jordan =

Joanna Jordan may refer to:

- Joanna Jordan (talent booker) (born 1966/7)
- Joanna Jordan (Irish campaigner), launched legal challenges against Irish referendum results in 2012 and 2018
- Joanna Jordan (Shortland Street), a character in Shortland Street

== See also ==
- Joanne Jordan (1920–2009), American actress and television spokesmodel
