= Jeff Jordan =

Jeff Jordan may refer to:

== Sports ==
- Jeff Jordan (defensive back) (1943–2022), American football player
- Jeff Jordan (running back) (born 1945), American football player
- Jeff Jordan (bobsleigh) (born 1956), American Olympic bobsledder

== Others ==
- Jeff Jordan (painter), American surrealist painter
- Jeff Jordan (venture capitalist), American venture capitalist

== See also ==
- Jeffrey Jordan (born 1988), American former basketball player
