= Michael Jordan (disambiguation) =

Michael Jordan (born 1963) is an American businessman and former professional basketball player.

Michael Jordan or Mike Jordan may also refer to:

== People ==
=== Sports ===
- Michael Jordan (footballer) (born 1986), English goalkeeper
- Mike Jordan (basketball, born 1977), American basketball coach and former professional player
- Mike Jordan (racing driver) (born 1958), English racing driver
- Mike Jordan (baseball, born 1863) (1863–1940), American baseball player
- Mike Jordan (cornerback) (born 1992), American football cornerback
- Michael Jordan (offensive lineman) (born 1998), American football offensive lineman
- Michal Jordán (born 1990), Czech ice hockey player

=== Other people ===
- Michael B. Jordan (born 1987), American actor
- Michael I. Jordan (born 1956), American researcher in statistics, machine learning, and artificial intelligence
- Michael Jordan (insolvency baron) (born 1931), English businessman
- Michael Jordan (politician), Irish Farmers' Party TD from Wexford, 1927–1932
- Michael H. Jordan (1936–2010), American executive for CBS, PepsiCo, Westinghouse
- Michael Jordan (mycologist), English mycologist
- Michael Jordan Bonema, American rapper, songwriter, and record producer known professionally as MIKE

== Other uses ==
- "Michael Jordan", a 2000 song by Five for Fighting from America Town
- "Michael Jordan", a 2010 song by Kendrick Lamar featuring Schoolboy Q from Overly Dedicated
- Michael Jordan: An American Hero, a 1999 American TV-film based on the basketball player's story
- Michael Jordan: Chaos in the Windy City, a 1994 video game featuring the basketball player

== See also ==
- Michael Jordan statue, Chicago statue of the basketball player Michael Jordan
- Michael (disambiguation)
- Jordan (disambiguation)
