= Charles Jordan =

Charles, Charley, Charlie or Chuck Jordan may refer to:

== Arts, design and entertainment ==
- Charles Jourdan (1883–1976), French fashion designer
- Charles Jordan (magician) (1888–1944), American magician
- Charley Jordan (1890–1954), American singer, songwriter, guitarist, and talent scout
- Charles Jordan (baritone) (1915–1986), Canadian singer
- Chuck Jordan (automobile designer) (1927–2010), American car designer
- Chuck Jordan (game designer), American video game designer

== Politics, humanitarianism and law ==
- Charles-Étienne Jordan (1700–1745), Prussian-born Huguenot refugee, advisor to Frederick the Great and author
- Charles Jordan (mayor) (1838–1912), mayor of Tauranga, New Zealand
- Charles H. Jordan (1908–1967) American humanitarian
- Charles Jordan (American politician) (1937–2014), American politician in Oregon
- Charles Jordan (government official), American architect and director of the Office of Transition for the Trust Territory of the Pacific Islands

== Sports ==
- Charles Jordan (rugby union) (fl. 1880s), Welsh rugby union player
- Charlie Jordan (baseball) (1871–1928), American baseball player
- Charles Jordan (basketball) (1954–2023), American basketball player
- Charles Jordan (American football) (born 1969), American football player

== Locations ==
- Charles A. Jordan House, historic house in Auburn, Maine, USA
- Charles E. Jordan High School, located in Durham, North Carolina, USA
- Dr. Charles Jordan House, historic house in Wakefield, Massachusetts, USA
- Charles Jordan Community Center, community center in Portland, Oregon, USA

== See also ==
- Chuck Jordan (disambiguation)
