= Frank Jordan (disambiguation) =

Frank Jordan (born 1935) is an American politician who served as the 40th mayor of San Francisco, California.

Frank Jordan may also refer to:

- Frank Jordan (cricketer) (1905–1995)
- Frank Jordan (footballer) (1883–1938)
- Frank Jordan (water polo) (1932–2012)
- Frank C. Jordan (died 1940), 20th Secretary of State of California
- Frank M. Jordan (1888–1970), 22nd Secretary of State of California
- Frank Jordan (American football) (1897–1980), American football player

== See also ==
- Frankie Jordan (1938–2025), French rock and roll singer
