= Larry Jordan =

Larry Jordan may refer to:

- Larry Jordan (basketball) (born 1962), American basketball executive
- Larry Jordan (filmmaker) (born 1934), American filmmaker
- Larry N. Jordan (born 1952), American journalist
- Air Wave, a fictional superhero appearing in DC Comics
