= George Jordan =

George Jordan may refer to:

- George Jordan (Virginia) (1620–1679), British attorney, planter and politician in the Colony of Virginia
- George Racey Jordan (1898–1966), American military officer, businessman, lecturer, activist, and author
- George Jordan (Medal of Honor) (1847–1904), Buffalo Soldier in the United States Army and Medal of Honor recipient
- George Jordan (footballer, born 1903) (1903–1972), Scottish footballer for Bury, Newport County and Rochdale
- George Jordan (footballer) (1917–1944), Scottish football right back
