= Henry Jordan (disambiguation) =

Henry Jordan (1935–1977) was an American football player.

Henry Jordan may also refer to:

- Henry Jordan (cricketer) (1898–1981), English cricketer
- Henry Jordan (politician) (1818–1890), English politician
- Hen Jordan (1894–1948), American baseball player
