= Carl Jordan =

Carl Jordan may refer to:

- Carl F. Jordan (fl. 1950s–2020s), professor of ecology
- Carl Friedrich Wilhelm Jordan (1819–1904), German writer and politician

== See also ==
- Karl Jordan (disambiguation)
