= David Jordan =

David Jordan or Dave Jordan or Davie Jordan may refer to:

- David K. Jordan (born 1942), professor emeritus at University of California, San Diego
- David Jordan (singer) (born 1985), British singer
- David Starr Jordan (1851–1931), president of Indiana University and Stanford University
- David C. Jordan (born 1935), U.S. ambassador to Peru
- David Charles Jordan (born 1949), New Brunswick, Canada politician
- David Davoe Jordan (born 1938), former member of the North Carolina House of Representatives
- David J. Jordan, US attorney for the District of Utah, 1991–1993
- Davy Jordan (1908–1989), Irish footballer
- David Lee Jordan (born 1934), Democratic member of the Mississippi Senate
- David Jordan (American football) (born 1962), American football player
- David Jordan (rugby union), former CEO of the Scottish rugby union club Glasgow Warriors
- Dave Jordan (footballer) (born 1971), English footballer
- Dave Jordan (music supervisor), the head of music at Marvel Studios
- NOAAS David Starr Jordan, an American fisheries research vessel of the National Oceanic and Atmospheric Administration
