= Louisa Jordan (disambiguation) =

Louisa Jordan was a Scottish nurse.

Louisa Jordan may also refer to:

- NHS Louisa Jordan Hospital in Glasgow
- Louisa Jordan, a fictional character in The 39 Steps (1935 film)

== See also ==
- Louise Jordan (disambiguation)
