= Crystal Jordan =

Crystal Jordan is a romance novelist who is published by Kensington Books, Samhain Publishing, Harlequin Spice Briefs, and Ellora's Cave. She has been a finalist in the National Readers' Choice Award (in 2010, 2011, and 2012), the Holt Medallion in 2011, the FF&P Prism Contest in 2009 and 2012, and the Booksellers Best Award in 2012. She won the 2009 Passionate Plume Award in Paranormal/Time Travel, and was a finalist in the contest in 2010 and 2011.

She is a member of the Romance Writers of America and began writing paranormal romance, contemporary romance, futuristic romance, erotic romance, and erotica after she finished graduate school in 2005. Born and raised in California, she lived and worked all over the United States before returning to her home state and assuming a position as a librarian at a university in the San Francisco Bay Area.

She has also been featured as part of The Popular Romance Project documentary.

== Published works ==
=== Kensington Aphrodisia ===
- "In Ice" in Sexy Beast V September 2008
- Carnal Desires December 2008
- On The Prowl May 2009
- "Naughty or Nice" in Under the Covers September 2009
- Untamed November 2009
- "Between Lovers" in Sexy Beast 9 September 2010
- Primal Heat October 2010
- Embrace the Night May 2011
- Prowl the Night September 2011
- "Taken Between" in Nightshift November 2011
- Night Games February 2012
- Unleashed September 2012

=== Cobblestone Press ===
- Full Swing August 2006

=== The Wild Rose Press ===
- All She Wants For Christmas December 2006
- A Lesson in Pleasure February 2007
- All She Needs September 2007

=== Ellora's Cave ===
- Black Opals October 2008
- All Revved Up November 2011

=== Samhain Publishing ===
- Treasured April 2008
- The Wanderer May 2010 (part of The Wasteland continuity series)
- Wasteland print omnibus April 2011 (part of The Wasteland continuity series)
- Demon's Caress January 2012

==== In the Heat of the Night Series ====
1. Total Eclipse of the Heart October 2008
2. Big Girls Don't Die January 2009
3. It's Raining Men May 2009
4. Crazy Little Thing Called Love July 2009
5. In the Heat of the Night print omnibus June 2010

==== Unbelievable Series ====
1. If You Believe September 2009
2. Believe In Me February 2010
3. Make Me Believe July 2011

==== Forbidden Passions Series ====
Co-written series with Loribelle Hunt

1. Stolen Passions November 2010
2. Passions Recalled December 2010, by Loribelle Hunt
3. Fleeting Passions February 2011
4. Passions March 2011, by Loribelle Hunt
5. Forbidden Passions print omnibus May 2012

=== Harlequin Spice Briefs ===
- Wild March 2009
- Wanton August 2011
- Wicked April 2012
