= Lena Jordan =

Russian gymnast

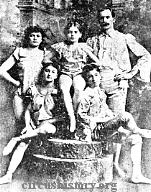
The Flying Jordans: Left to right - (standing) Mamie Jordan; (seated) Lena Jordan; (center) Nellie Jordan; (seated) Steve Ouff; (standing) Lew Jordan.

Lena Jordan (1880/81 – unknown) was a Russian gymnast, who performed in circuses during the 19th century. In 1897, Jordan was the first recorded person to perform a triple somersault.

== Career ==
Jordan started doing gymnastics in the Russian Empire (now Latvia) in 1892. She initially worked for the Flying Jordans circus. It was claimed that she performed a triple somersault during a routine in the US in 1896, although this has not been officially recognised. In May 1897, Jordan, aged 16, became the first recorded person to perform a triple somersault during a routine in Sydney, Australia. Jordan later joined the Barnum & Bailey Circus, during which time she performed the triple somersault 28 times. For many years, Ernest Clarke was wrongly attributed as performing the first recorded triple somersault. However, he first performed a triple somersault in 1909, 12 years after Jordan. In 1975, the Guinness Book of World Records acknowledged Jordan as the record holder.
