= Chris Jordan =

Chris Jordan may refer to:

- Chris Jordan (artist) (born 1963), American environmental artist, photographer and film maker
- Chris Jordan (cricketer) (born 1988), English cricketer who plays for Sussex
- Chris Jordan (rugby league), New Zealand rugby league player

== See also ==
- Kris Jordan (1977–2023), American politician
