= Michael Jordan (mycologist) =

British mycologist

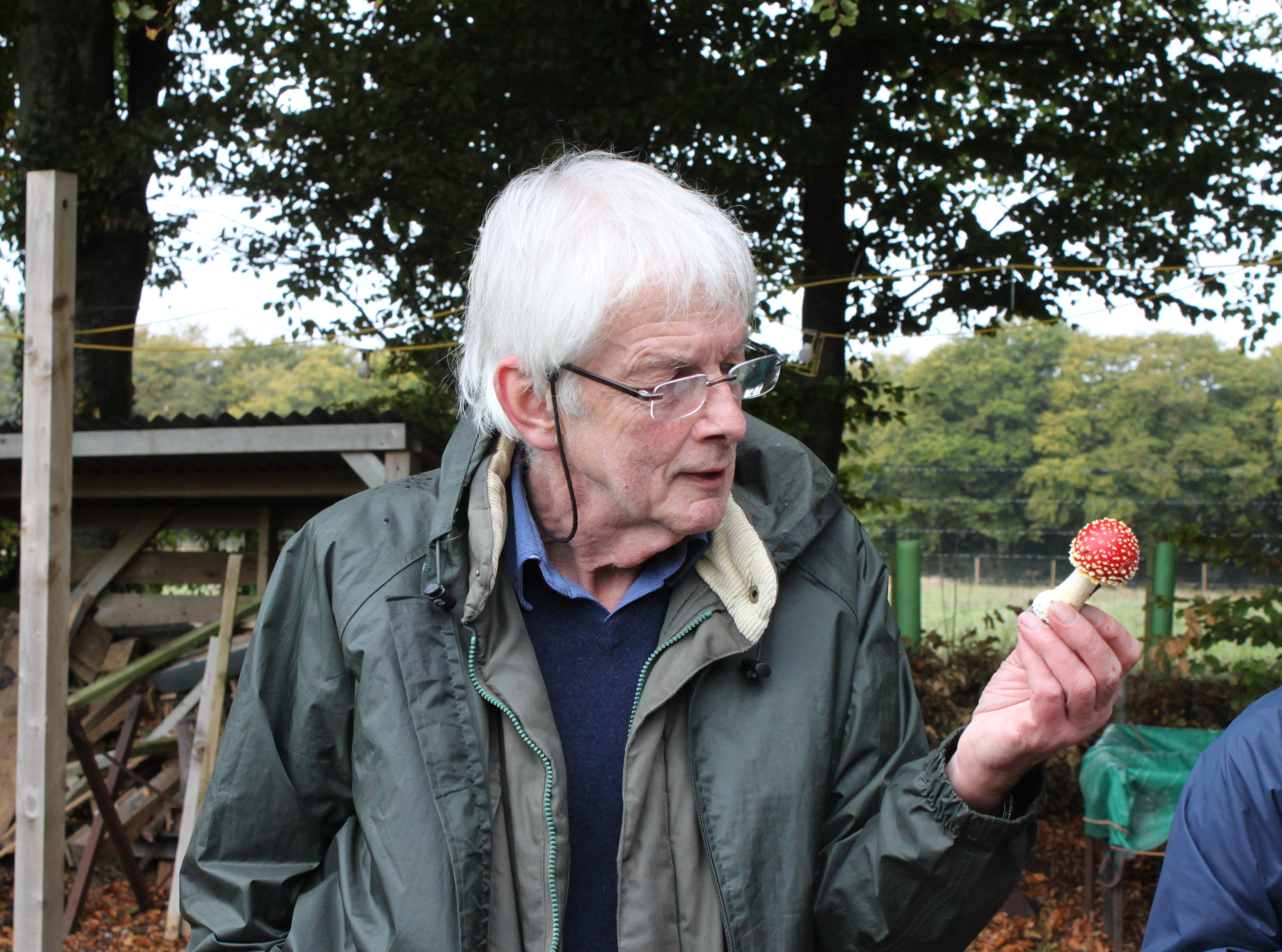
Jordan in 2022

Michael Jordan is an English mycologist, author of The Encyclopedia of Fungi of Britain and Europe, founder and chairman of the Association of British Fungal Groups (ABFG).

Jordan founded ABFG in 1996, having observed an upsurge in interest in mushroom hunting since presenting Mushroom Magic, a documentary on Channel 4 in 1989. The ABFG maintains a database of fungus observations for the UK, called CATE, collates affiliated fungus groups, and serves as a national organisation for individual members.

== Publications ==
- Mushroom Magic (1989)
- Edible Mushrooms and Other Fungi (1993)
- The Encyclopedia of Fungi of Britain and Europe (1995, 2004) ISBN 978-0-7112-2379-0
