= Chuck Jordan =

Chuck Jordan may refer to:

- Chuck Jordan (automobile designer) (1927–2010), General Motors car designer
- Chuck Jordan (game designer), American video game designer
- Charles Jordan (government official), Armenian architect and government official

== See also ==
- Charles Jordan (disambiguation)
