= Robert Jordan (disambiguation) =

Robert Jordan (1948–2007) was an American author of epic fantasy.

Robert, Bob, or Bobby Jordan may also refer to:

== People ==
=== Law ===
- Robert E. Jordan III (1936–2010), American General Counsel of the Army
- Robert H. Jordan (1916–1992), American justice in Georgia
- Robert Leon Jordan (1934–2024), American judge in Tennessee
- Robert W. Jordan (born 1945), American lawyer and diplomat

=== Sports ===
- Robert Jordan (baseball) (1867–1931), Negro leagues first baseman
- Robert F. Jordan (1927–2004), American bridge player
- Robert Jordan (American football) (born 1986), Canadian football player

=== Other people ===
- Robert Jordan (sailor) (1826–1881), American sailor and recipient of the Medal of Honor
- Robert B. Jordan (1932–2020), American politician in North Carolina
- Robert Furneaux Jordan (1905–1978), English architect and novelist
- Bob Jordan, a pen name of Fletcher Hanks (1889–1976), American cartoonist
- Bob Jordan (businessman), CEO of Southwest Airlines
- Bob Jordan (newscaster) (born 1943), American TV news journalist
- Bobby Jordan (Robert G. Jordan, 1923–1965), American actor

== Fictional characters ==
- Robert Jordan (character), in Ernest Hemingway's For Whom The Bell Tolls
