= Roy Jordan =

English footballer

Personal information
- Full name: Roy Anthony Jordan
- Date of birth: 17 April 1978 (age 48)
- Place of birth: Plymouth, England
- Position: Winger

Youth career
- Torquay United
- 1995–1997: Hereford United

Senior career*
Years	Team	Apps	(Gls)
1997–1998	Hereford United	2	(0)
- →Newport County (loan)
- Merthyr Tydfil
199?–1999	Pegasus Juniors		
1999–2000	Newport County		
2000	Gloucester City		
2000	Pegasus Juniors		
2000–2002	Kington Town		
2002–200?	Westfields		
- Worcester City
200?–2005	Westfields		
2005	AFC Telford United		
2005–2010	Westfields		
2010–2012	Mercia Athletic	15	(8)
- * Club domestic league appearances and goals

Roy Anthony Jordan (born 17 April 1978) is an English professional footballer. He currently plays for Mercia Athletic.

Jordan began his career as a junior with Torquay United and had trials with Yeovil Town and Bristol Rovers before joining Hereford United as an apprentice in 1995. He made his league debut on 1 March 1997 in a 2–1 home defeat against Exeter City, and remained with the Bulls as they began life in the Conference, though Jordan played just once that season. He joined Newport County on loan, before moving to Merthyr Tydfil and then Hellenic League side Pegasus Juniors, whom he left in the 1999 close season to rejoin Newport County whilst working as a plumber. Including his previous loan spell he made 18 league appearances for Newport.

His next move took him to Gloucester City in March 2000 when he was signed without the knowledge of City manager Brian Hughes. His stay with Gloucester was brief as he had returned to play for Pegasus Juniors before the end of that season.

In August 2000 he was jailed for 28 days after being involved in a fight outside a pub in Hereford, and more specifically for kicking a man as he lay on the ground. On his release he joined West Midlands League side Kington Town, leaving for the first of a number of spells with Westfields in June 2002 after his release by Kington. chairmen

He later played for Worcester City. He left Westfields to join Telford United in January 2005, but rejoined Westfields in November the same year, having played six times in the league for Telford that season. He moved to Mercia Athletic in 2010.
