= List of battalions of the Black Watch =

The Black Watch existed as an infantry regiment of the British Army from 1881 to 2006.

== Original composition ==
When the 42nd (Royal Highland) Regiment of Foot amalgamated with the 73rd (Perthshire) Regiment of Foot, to become the Black Watch (Royal Highlanders) in 1881 under the Cardwell-Childers reforms of the British Armed Forces, seven pre-existent militia and volunteer battalions of Fife, Forfarshire, and Perthshire were integrated into the structure of the regiment. Volunteer battalions had been created in reaction to a perceived threat of invasion by France in the late 1850s. Organised as "rifle volunteer corps", they were independent of the British Army and composed primarily of the middle class.

Battalion	Formed	Formerly
Regular
1st	1739	1st Battalion, 42nd Highlanders
2nd	1780	1st Battalion, 73rd Regiment of Foot
Militia
3rd (Militia)	1798	The 86th Royal Perthshire Rifles
Volunteers
1st (Dundee) Volunteer	1859	1st Forfar (Dundee) Rifle Volunteer Corps
2nd (Angus) Volunteer	1859	2nd Forfar (Forfarshire, or Angus) Rifle Volunteer Corps
3rd (Dundee Highland) Volunteer	1860	3rd Forfar (Dundee Highland) Rifle Volunteer Corps
4th (Perthshire) Volunteer	1859	1st Perthshire Rifle Volunteer Corps
5th (Perthshire Highland) Volunteer	1860	2nd Perthshire (The Perthshire Highland) Rifle Volunteer Corps
6th (Fifeshire) Volunteer	1860	1st Fifeshire Rifle Volunteer Corps

== Reorganisation ==
The Territorial Force (later Territorial Army) was formed in 1908, which the volunteer battalions joined, while the militia battalions transferred to the "Special Reserve".

Battalion	Formerly
4th (City of Dundee)	1st (City of Dundee) Volunteer Battalion
5th (Angus and Dundee)	Amalgamation of 2nd (Angus), and 3rd (Dundee Highland) Volunteer Battalions
6th (Perthshire)	4th (Perthshire) Volunteer Battalion
7th (Fife)	6th (Fifeshire) Volunteer Battalion
8th (Cyclist)	5th (Perthshire Highland) Volunteer Battalion

== First World War ==
The Black Watch fielded 25 battalions and lost 8,390 officers and other ranks during the course of the war. The regiment's territorial components formed duplicate second and third line battalions. As an example, the three-line battalions of the 5th Black Watch were numbered as the 1/5th, 2/5th, and 3/5th respectively. Many battalions of the regiment were formed as part of Secretary of State for War Lord Kitchener's appeal for an initial 100,000 men volunteers in 1914. They were referred to as the New Army or Kitchener's Army. The Volunteer Training Corps were raised with overage or reserved occupation men early in the war, and were initially self-organised into many small corps, with a wide variety of names. Recognition of the corps by the authorities brought regulation and as the war continued the small corps were formed into battalion sized units of the county Volunteer Regiment. In 1918 these were linked to county regiments.

Battalion	Formed	Served	Fate
Regular
1st	1739	Western Front	
2nd	1780	Western Front, Mesopotamian, Palestine	
Special Reserve
3rd (Reserve)	1798	Britain, Ireland	
Territorial Force
1/4th (City of Dundee)	1859	Western Front	See Inter-War
1/5th (Angus and Dundee)	1908	Western Front	Amalgamated with the 1/4th Battalion, to become the 4/5th Battalion on 15 March 1916
1/6th (Perthshire)	1859	Western Front	See Inter-War
1/7th (Fife)	1860	Western Front	See Inter-War
2/4th (City of Dundee)	Dundee, September 1914	Britain	Disbanded on 19 December 1917
2/5th (Angus and Dundee)	Forfar, September 1914	Britain	Absorbed into the 2/4th (City of Dundee) Battalion in November 1915
2/6th (Perthshire)	Perth, September 1914	Britain	Disbanded in September 1917
2/7th (Fife)	St. Andrews, September 1914	Britain	Disbanded in April 1918
3/4th (City of Dundee), 4th (City of Dundee) (Reserve) from 8 April 1916	Dundee, March 1915	Britain	Disbanded 1919
3/5th (Angus and Dundee), 5th (Angus and Dundee) (Reserve) upon amalgamation	Forfar, March 1915	Britain	Amalgamated into the 4th (City of Dundee) (Reserve) on the 8 April 1916
3/6th (Perthshire), 6th (Perthshire) (Reserve) upon amalgamation	Perth, April 1915	Britain	Amalgamated into the 4th (City of Dundee) (Reserve) on the 8 April 1916
3/7th (Fife), 7th (Fife) (Reserve) upon amalgamation	St. Andrews, April 1915	Britain	Amalgamated into the 4th (City of Dundee) (Reserve) on the 8 April 1916
13th (Scottish Horse Yeomanry)	Abbassia, 1 October 1916, from the 1st and 2nd Scottish Horse Regiments	Salonika, Western Front	Returned to the Scottish Horse in 1919
14th (Fife and Forfar) Yeomanry	Ismalia, 21 December 1916, from the 1st Fife and Forfar Yeomanry	Palestine, Western Front	Returned to the Fife and Forfar Yeomanry in 1919
New Army
8th (Service)	Perth, 21 August 1914	Western Front	Disbanded in 1919
9th (Service)	Perth, 13 September 1914	Western Front, Britain	Disbanded in 1919
10th (Service)	Perth, 13 September 1914	Western Front, Salonika	Disbanded on 15 October 1918
11th (Service)	Nigg, October 1914	Britain	Became the 38th Training Reserve Battalion, in the 9th Reserve Brigade
15th (Service)	Deal, 1 June 1918	Britain	Absorbed into the 9th (Service) Battalion on 19 June 1918
Others
12th (Labour)	Blairgowrie, May 1916	Western Front	Became the 5th and 6th Labour Companies of the Labour Corps
Volunteer Training Corps
1/1st Battalion City of Dundee Volunteer Regiment later the 1st Volunteer Battalion, Black Watch		Dundee	Disbanded post war
2/1st Battalion City of Dundee Volunteer Regiment later the 2nd Volunteer Battalion, Black Watch		Dundee	Disbanded post war
1/1st Battalion Forfarshire Volunteer Regiment later the 3rd Volunteer Battalion, Black Watch		Forfar	Disbanded post war
2/1st Battalion Forfarshire Volunteer Regiment later the 4th Volunteer Battalion, Black Watch		Arbroath	Disbanded post war
1st Battalion Perthshire Volunteer Regiment later the 5th Volunteer Battalion		Perth	Disbanded post war
2nd Battalion Perthshire Volunteer Regiment later the 6th Volunteer Battalion		Crieff	Disbanded post war
1/1st Battalion Fifeshire Volunteer Regiment later the 7th Volunteer Battalion, Black Watch		Kirkcaldy	Disbanded post war
2/1st Battalion Fifeshire Volunteer Regiment later the 8th Volunteer Battalion, Black Watch		Dunfermline	Disbanded post war
2nd Battalion Fifeshire Volunteer Regiment later the 9th Volunteer Battalion, Black Watch		St. Andrew's	Disbanded post war

== Inter-War ==
By 1920, all of the regiment's war-raised battalions had disbanded. The Black Watch did not, however, return to its original peacetime size; half of its territorial battalions were lost to amalgamation shortly after the war ended. The Special Reserve reverted to its militia designation in 1921, then to the Supplementary Reserve in 1924; however, its battalions were effectively placed in 'suspended animation'. As World War II approached, the Territorial Army was reorganised in the mid-1930s, many of its infantry battalions were converted to other roles, especially anti-aircraft.

Battalion	Fate
4th (City of Dundee)	Amalgamated with the 5th (Angus and Dundee) Battalion, to form the 4th/5th (Dundee and Angus) Battalion on 31 December 1921
5th (Angus and Dundee)	Amalgamated with the 4th (City of Dundee) Battalion, to form the 4th/5th (Dundee and Angus) Battalion on 31 December 1921
6th (Perthshire)	Amalgamated with the 7th (Fife) Battalion, to form the 6th/7th (Perth and Fife) Battalion on 31 December 1921
7th (Fife)	Amalgamated with the 6th (Perthshire) Battalion, to form the 6th/7th (Perth and Fife) Battalion on 31 December 1921

== Second World War ==
The Black Watch's expansion during the Second World War was modest compared to 1914–1918. National Defence Companies were combined to create a new "Home Defence" battalion. In addition to this, 22 battalions of the Home Guard across Perthshire, Fife, Angus, Dundee and Kinross-shire were affiliated to the regiment, wearing its cap badge, and also by 1944 one rocket battery (Z Battery). Due to the daytime (or shift working) occupations of these men, the batteries required eight times the manpower of an equivalent regular battery. A number of Light Anti-Aircraft (LAA) troops were formed from the local battalions to defend specific points, such as factories.

Battalion	Formed	Served	Fate
Regular
1st	1739	France, North Africa, Sicily, France, Western front	
2nd	1780	Somaliland, Crete, North Africa, India, Burma (Chindits)	See Post-World War II
Supplementary Reserve
3rd	1798		See Post-World War II
Territorial Army
4th (City of Dundee), (redesignation of 4th/5th (Dundee and Angus) Battalion)	1921	France, Gibraltar, Britain	See Post-World War II
5th (Angus and Dundee)	1939, as a duplicate of 4th (City of Dundee) Battalion	France, North Africa, Sicily, Western Front	See Post-World War II
6th (Perthshire), (redesignation of 6th/7th (Perth and Fife) Battalion)	1921	France, Britain, North Africa, Italy, Greece	See Post-World War II
7th (Fife), (redesignation of 6th/7th (Perth and Fife) Battalion)	1939, as a duplicate of 6th (Perthshire) Battalion	France, North Africa, Sicily, Italy, Western Front	See Post-World War II
8th (Training)	1939	Britain	Amalgamated with the 9th (Home Defence) Battalion in August 1941
9th (Home Defence)	November 1939	Britain	Sent as reinforcements, to the 6th (Perthshire) Battalion in North Africa, upon amalgamation
10th	1940 (transferred to the Black Watch from the Orkney and Shetland Islands Defence Forces in 1943)	Britain	Disbanded in 1946
30th	1941	Britain	Disbanded in 1943
Others
50th (Holding)	1940	Britain	Disbanded 1943
70th (Young Soldier)	1940	Britain	Disbanded 1942

Home Guard
Battalion	Headquarters	Formation Sign (dark blue on khaki)	Battalion	Headquarters	Formation Sign (dark blue on khaki)
Angus
1st	Brechin	ANG 1	2nd	Forfar	ANG 2
3rd	Arbroath	ANG 3			
Dundee
1st	City of Dundee	DDE 1	2nd	City of Dundee	DDE 2
3rd	City of Dundee (13 G.P.O.)	DDE 3			
Fife
1st	Cupar	F 1	2nd	St. Andrews	F 2
3rd	Anstruther	F 3	4th	Leven	F 4
5th	Kirkcaldy	F 5	6th	Lochgelly	F 6
7th	Dunfermline	F 7	8th	Kirkaldy	F 8
9th	Rosyth Dockyard	F 9	10th	Donibristle	F 10
Kinross-shire Independent Company	Kinross	--			
Perthshire
1st	North Perthshire	TAY 1	2nd	Blairgowrie	TAY 2
3rd	Strathern	TAY 3	4th	Perth	TAY 4
5th	Dunblane	TAY 5	6th	Perth City	TAY 6
Home Guard Anti-Aircraft units
Formation Sign (dark blue on khaki)	Headquarters or Location	AA Formation and Designation	Formation Sign (dark blue on khaki)	Headquarters or Location	AA Formation and Designation
DDE 101	City of Dundee	218th Battery, 20th Anti-Aircraft Regiment (Home Guard) (Z battery)	F 5	Burntisland, (British Aluminium Co. Ltd)	A Troop LAA
F 9	Lathalmond, (Royal Navy Stores Depot)	A Troop LAA			

== Post-World War II ==
In the immediate post-war period, the army was significantly reduced: nearly all infantry regiments had their first and second battalions amalgamated and the Supplementary Reserve disbanded.

Battalion	Fate
1st	Amalgamated with 2nd Battalion on the 13 July 1948, without a change in title
2nd	Amalgamated with 1st Battalion on the 13 July 1948
4th (City of Dundee)	Amalgamated with 5th (Angus and Dundee) Battalion on the 1 January 1947, to form the 4th/5th (Dundee and Angus) Battalion
5th (Angus and Dundee)	Amalgamated with 4th (City of Dundee) Battalion on the 1 January 1947, to form the 4th/5th (Dundee and Angus) Battalion
6th (Perthshire)	Amalgamated with 7th (Fife) Battalion on the 1 January 1947, to form the 6th/7th (Perthshire and Fife) Battalion
7th (Fife)	Amalgamated with 6th (Perthshire) Battalion on the 1 January 1947, to form the 6th/7th (Perthshire and Fife) Battalion

== Amalgamation ==
The 2003 Defence White Paper, titled Delivering Security in a Changing World, set out the future structure of the British military, one of the points being that the single-battalion regiments would be amalgamated into large, multi-battalion regiments. All of the Scottish regiments were amalgamated to form the 7 battalion strong Royal Regiment of Scotland.

Battalion	Fate
1st	Became the 3rd Battalion (Black Watch), Royal Regiment of Scotland
3rd (V), a battalion formed through the amalgamation of the 4th/5th and 6th/7th Battalions, in 1967	Became A (Black Watch) Company of the 7th Battalion (51st Highland), Royal Regiment of Scotland
