= Mark Jordan =

Mark Jordan or Marc Jordan may refer to:

- Marc Jordan (born 1947), American-born Canadian musician and actor
- Mark Jordan (Shortland Street), Shortland Street characters
- Mark D. Jordan, professor of Christian Thought at Harvard Divinity School
- Mark Jordan Legan, American television producer
- C. Mark Jordan, American automobile designer
- DJ Pooh (Mark Jordan, born 1966), American record producer rapper
- Mark T. Jordan American (born in Rhode Island) musician, songwriter, lead singer of The Edison Electric Band in the 1970s

== See also ==
- Mark Jordon (born 1965), English actor
