= Louise Jordan (disambiguation) =

Louise Jordan was a geologist.

Louise Jordan may also refer to:

- Louise Jordan (novelist)

== See also ==
- Louise Jordan Smith, American painter and academic
- Louisa Jordan (disambiguation)
