= Nick Jordan =

Nick Jordan may refer to:

- Nick Jordan (character), a fictional doctor from BBC's Casualty and Holby City
- Nick Jordan (politician) (born 1949), Kansas state senator
- Nick Jordan (artist) (born 1967), British visual artist and filmmaker
- Nick Jordan (actor) (1941–1990), Italian actor and stunman
