= Caelum Jordan =

English rugby league player

Personal information
- Full name: Caelum Jordan
- Born: 16 September 2002 (age 23)

Playing information
- Position: Centre, Wing
Club
Years	Team	Pld	T	G	FG	P
2021	Castleford Tigers	1	0	0	0	0
2023	Dewsbury Rams	12	8	0	0	32
2025–2026	Dewsbury Rams	26	13	0	0	52
	Total	39	21	0	0	84
- Source: As of 23 June 2023

Caelum Jordan is an English professional rugby league footballer who most recently played as a centre or winger for the Dewsbury Rams in the RFL Championship.

On 11 July 2021, he made his Super League début for the Castleford Tigers against the Salford Red Devils.

In October 2022, Jordan signed for the Dewsbury Rams in League 1.

In May 2026, it was announced that Jordan had left Dewsbury Rams and joined Hunslet ARLFC in the NCRL National Premier League.
