= David Davoe Jordan =

American politician

Member of the North Carolina House of Representatives
- In office 1967–1969
- In office 1973–1975

Personal details
- Born: December 12, 1938 (age 87) Dillon, South Carolina, U.S.
- Party: Republican
- Education: Duke University

David Davoe Jordan (born December 12, 1938) is an American politician. He served as a Republican member of the North Carolina House of Representatives.

== Life and career ==
Jordan was born in Dillon, South Carolina. He attended Duke University and served in the United States Army.

Jordan served in the North Carolina House of Representatives from 1967 to 1969 and again from 1973 to 1975.
