= Governor Jordan =

Governor Jordan may refer to:

- Chester B. Jordan (1839–1914), 48th Governor of New Hampshire
- Len Jordan (1899–1983), 23rd Governor of Idaho

== See also ==
- Bill Jordan, Baron Jordan (born 1936), governor of the London School of Economics
- Ricardo López Jordán (1822–1889), provisional governor of Entre Ríos province, Argentina
- Robert B. Jordan (1932–2020), 29th Lieutenant Governor of North Carolina and unsuccessful gubernatorial candidate
