= Anthony Jordan =

Anthony Jordan may refer to:

- Anthony Jordan (archbishop) (1901–1982), Scottish-Canadian Catholic Archbishop of Edmonton, Canada
- Anthony D. Jordan (1934–2025), English badminton player
- Anthony J. Jordan, Irish biographer

== See also ==
- Tony Jordan (disambiguation)
