= Peter Jordan =

Peter Jordan may refer to:

- Peter Jordan (agronomist) (1751–1827), Austrian agronomist
- Peter Jordan (presenter), Canadian television presenter
- Peter Jordan (actor) (born 1967), German film actor
- Peter G. Jordan, president of Tarrant County College
- Peter Jordan, occasional substitute (and later full time) bass player with the New York Dolls, originally their roadie
