= Judge Jordan =

Judge Jordan may refer to:

- Adalberto Jordan (born 1961), judge of the United States Court of Appeals for the Eleventh Circuit
- Daniel P. Jordan III (born 1964), judge of the United States District Court for the Southern District of Mississippi
- Kent A. Jordan (born 1957), judge of the United States Court of Appeals for the Third Circuit
- Robert Leon Jordan (1934–2024), judge of the United States District Court for the Eastern District of Tennessee
- Sean D. Jordan (born 1965), judge of the United States District Court for the Eastern District of Texas

== See also ==
- Justice Jordan (disambiguation)
