= Dr. Charles Jordan House =

Historic house in Massachusetts, United States

- U.S. National Register of Historic Places
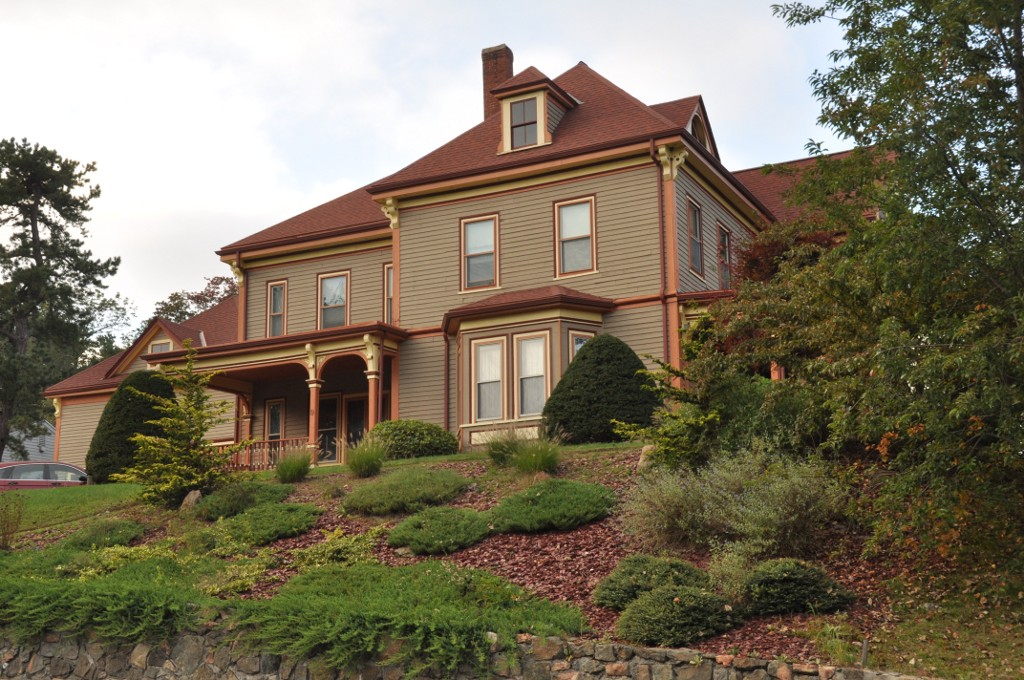

- Location within Massachusetts Location within the United States
- Location: 9 Jordan Ave., Wakefield, Massachusetts
- Coordinates: 42°29′55″N 71°5′8″W
- Built: 1885
- Architectural style: Queen Anne
- MPS: Wakefield MRA
- NRHP reference No.: 89000716
- Added to NRHP: July 06, 1989

The Dr. Charles Jordan House is a historic house at 9 Jordan Avenue in Wakefield, Massachusetts. Built c. 1885, it is one Wakefield's most elaborate Queen Anne Victorian houses. The 2 1/2-story wood-frame house is unusual for having a hipped roof; it also has a tower in the northwest corner, and a porch with Italianate pillars brackets. The house was built by Dr. Charles Jordan, a local physician and pharmacist with extensive land holdings in the area.

The house was listed on the National Register of Historic Places in 1989.

== See also ==
- National Register of Historic Places listings in Wakefield, Massachusetts
- National Register of Historic Places listings in Middlesex County, Massachusetts
