= Steve Jordan =

Steve, Stephen, or Steven Jordan may refer to:

== Music ==
- Steve Jordan (guitarist) (1919–1993), American jazz guitarist
- Steve Jordan (drummer) (born 1957), American drummer, studio musician
- Steve Jordan (accordionist) (born Esteban Jordan) (1939–2010), American conjunto (norteño) and Tejano musician
- Stevie J (Steven Jordan, born 1973), American musician, record producer, songwriter and television personality

== Sports ==
- Steve Jordan (tight end) (born 1961), American football tight end for the NFL's Minnesota Vikings
- Steve Jordan (placekicker) (born 1963), American football placekicker
- Stephen Jordan (Canadian football) (born 1966), American defensive back in the Canadian Football League
- Stephen Jordan (footballer) (born 1982), English footballer

== Politics ==
- Stephen Jordan (politician) (1886–1975), Irish Fianna Fáil politician
- Steve Jordan (politician), American politician from Missouri

== Other ==
- Stephen Jordan (writer) (born 1986), English writer, playwright and director
- Steven L. Jordan (born 1956), Civil Affairs officer for the United States Army Reserve
