= Scott Jordan =

Scott Jordan is the name of:

- Scott Jordan (footballer) (born 1975), English footballer; played for York City and Scarborough
- Scott Jordan (baseball) (born 1963), Major League Baseball player for the Georgia Tech Yellow Jackets and the Cleveland Indians
- Scott Jordan, founder of the American clothing company Scottevest
