= Sari Jordan =

- Born: Harrington Park, New Jersey, US
- Origin: New Orleans, Louisiana, US
- Education: Tulane University (BA)
- Genres: Alternative pop; jazz pop; alt jazz
- Occupations: Singer-songwriter; musician
- Instruments: Guitar; piano; vocals
- Website: www.sarijordan.com

Sari Jordan is an American singer-songwriter and multi-instrumentalist. Jordan released their deput EP Sing to the Moon in October 2023 and their debut full-length album PERFECT BE THE ENEMY in May 2026.

== Life and career ==
Jordan was born and raised in Harrington Park, New Jersey. They moved to New Orleans in 2018 to attend Tulane University.

Jordan's musical style has been referred to as jazz pop, alternative pop, psychedelic rock, neosoul, Broadway, and alt jazz. They are also often compared to Norah Jones. Jordan frequently collaborates with other New Orleans musicians as a background vocalist or sideman and has worked with artists such as Billy Iuso, Renee Gros, Anna Moss, and Isaac Eady.

They released the single "Ceasefire!” in September 2023, which was reviewed by Bobby Patrick of BroadwayWorld as "one to return to over time to hear and to feel an artist’s sound portrait of heartfelt circumstance that comes to all those who love." In October 2023 Jordan released their debut EP Sing to the Moon. In a positive review Natalie Patrick wrote of the EP for Earmilk: "Each track on the album is a unique emotional expression, taking you on a captivating journey from the first note to the last."

Jordan released their debut full-length album PERFECT BE THE ENEMY in May 2026. The album has four singles, “FREAK", “TABLE OF ANGELS”, “FANCY” and “GROW APART." Jordan co-produced the album with Ajaï Combelic and bassist Robin Sherman at Lil Squeeze Studio. They also mixed and mastered with sound engineer Mack Major. Jake Clapp wrote of the album in the Gambit, "The 11 songs on “Perfect Be The Enemy” center Jordan’s warm vocals, playful phrasing and finger-plucked electric guitar, and there are layers to sink into as cellos, trombones, bass and drums color in the daydreams." Sabrina Stone of Antigravity Magazine reviewed the album as "a capture of a young artist blooming into new musical possibilities."

Jordan is nonbinary and uses they/them pronouns. They reside in New Orleans.

== Discography ==
=== EP ===
- Sing to the Moon (2023)

=== Studio albums ===
- PERFECT BE THE ENEMY (2026)
