= Harrison Jordan =

Politician in Louisiana

Harrison Jordan (1804–1871) was a politician in Louisiana. In 1871 he became a member of the Louisiana House of Representatives. He represented Richland Parish.
