= Alfred Jordan =

Alfred Jordan may refer to:

- Alfred Jordan (footballer) (1900–1969), Irish footballer
- Alfred Jordan (draughts player) (died 1926), English draughts player
- Alfred Jordan (Canadian football), Canadian football cornerback
