= D. J. Jordan =

D. J. Jordan was a lawyer, professor, and college president.

He wrote articles. His wife was a school principal in Atlanta. He wrote on whether “Negro” educators should teach at colleges for African American students in Daniel Wallace Culp’s 1902 book, which also profiled him.

He was a professor at Morris Brown College. He served as president of Edward Waters College.
