= Nancy C. Jordan =

American educator

Academic background
- Education: BA, University of Iowa; MA, Northwestern University; Ed.D., Human Development, 1985, Harvard University
- Thesis: Language processing and reading ability in children: a developmental study based on speech shadowing techniques (1985)

Academic work
- Institutions: University of Delaware; Rutgers University; University of North Carolina at Chapel Hill

Nancy C. Jordan is an American educator. She is the Dean Family Endowed Professorship for Teacher Education at the University of Delaware. Jordan and her colleagues developed Number Sense Interventions, a curriculum that allows teachers to help students at risk for these mathematical challenges.

== Early life and education ==
Jordan completed her Bachelor of Arts degree at the University of Iowa and her Master's degree in teaching from Northwestern University. Following this, she completed her doctoral degree at Harvard University in 1985.

== Career ==
Upon completing her formal education, Jordan became the Head of Special Education Services in the Clinical Center for the Study of Development and Learning at the University of North Carolina at Chapel Hill. Following this, she was a Post-Doctoral Research Fellow in Child Development at the University of Chicago. From 1990 to 1995, Jordan was an assistant professor in the Department of Educational Psychology at Rutgers University.

Jordan joined the faculty of Education at the University of Delaware in 1995. In this role, she worked alongside David Kaplan to follow 300 kindergartners in the Christina School District through third grade to track their mathematic struggles. The aim of the study was to identify those suffering from math learning disabilities and develop better instructional techniques for overcoming them. As a result, she began developing Number Sense Interventions, a curriculum that allows teachers to help students at risk for these mathematical challenges.

In 2009, Jordan received a five-year, $1.1 million grant from the National Institute of Child Health and Human Development to address the development of number sense in children at risk for mathematics learning difficulties. Through this grant, Jordan and colleagues Nancy Dyson, Joseph Glutting, Brenna Hassinger-Das, and Casey Irwin, evaluated the math skills of children from five Delaware elementary schools that served primarily low-income children. They published their findings in 2012 and found that the Number Sense Interventions group performed better on number competencies and math achievement than the comparison groups. She later co-created Screener for Early Number Sense (SENS) to help kindergarten teachers identify where students in prekindergarten, kindergarten, and Grade 1 need targeted instruction in the domains of number, number relations, and number operations.

On March 21, 2019, Jordan was appointed to the Dean Family Endowed Professorship for Teacher Education. During the COVID-19 pandemic, Jordan and colleague Charles A. MacArthur were elected Fellows of the American Educational Research Association. She was also the recipient of the Kauffman-Hallahan-Pullen Distinguished Researcher Award from the Division of Research in the Council of Exceptional Children. Jordan also served on the Committee on Early Childhood Mathematics of the National Research Council of the National Academies and on the panel of Institute of Education Practice Guide on teaching math to young children.
