= Wilhelm Jordan =

Wilhelm Jordan may refer to:

- Carl Friedrich Wilhelm Jordan (1819–1904), known as Wilhelm Jordan, German writer and politician
- Wilhelm Jordan (geodesist) (1842–1899), German scientist, noted for the Gauss–Jordan elimination algorithm
