= Johann Christoph Jordan =

Johann Christoph (von) Jordan (died 1748) was a German bureaucrat and antiquary. He wrote in Latin, and his most important work was a history of the Slavic peoples, De Originibus Slavicis, published in 1745.

Originally from the Rhineland, Jordan served as a senior official in the Bohemian Court Chancery (Böhmische Hofkanzlei).
