= Dulcina Mason Jordan =

American poet and journalist (1833–1895)

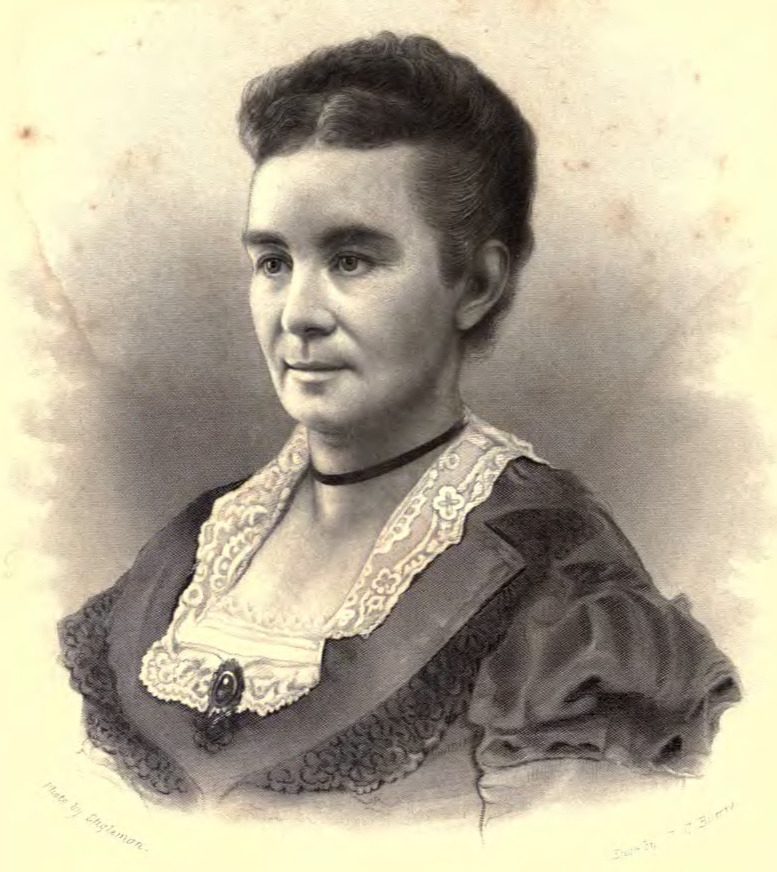
- Born: July 21, 1833; Marathon
- Died: April 25, 1895; Richmond
- Occupation: Writer

Dulcina Minerva Mason Jordan (July 21, 1833 – April 25, 1895) was an American poet and journalist.

Dulcina Minerva Mason was born on July 21, 1833 in Marathon, New York and her parents relocated to Indiana in 1843. She married James J. Jordan, a Richmond, Indiana businessman, in 1851.

She published a single volume of poetry, Rosemary Leaves (1873). One poem from that collection, a humorous account of the unveiling of the Tyler Davidson Fountain, was reprinted in the London Times.

In addition to publishing in magazines and newspapers, she served as an associate editor of Cincinnati Saturday Night for three years and an editor at the Richmond Independent for ten years. At the latter newspaper, her friend James Whitcomb Riley enlisted her to write an article to support his hoax claiming that his poem "Leonainie" was a lost poem written by Edgar Allan Poe.

Dulcina Mason Jordan died on 25 April 1895 in Richmond, Indiana.
