= Gina Jordan =

Canadian pilot and Christian missionary (1929–2013)

Regina Margaret Jordan (August 30, 1929 – September 3, 2013) was a Canadian pilot and Christian missionary. She was the second woman pilot to fly with Mission Aviation Fellowship (MAF) in 1982. Jordan flew as a pilot and flight instructor in Africa until 1994, and later served on the board of directors of Mission Aviation Fellowship until 2001. She was awarded the Northern Lights award in 2012.

== Biography ==
Regina Margaret Jordan was born in Saint John, New Brunswick on August 30 1929, and learned to fly at the Fundy Bay Flying Club in 1952. She obtained her Instructor rating in 1959 and began her flight instruction career. In 1970, she opened her own advanced flying school in Calgary specializing in Commercial pilot training. She moved to Redwoods, California in 1982 to complete advanced training in order to qualify as pilot on overseas missionary flights for Mission Aviation Fellowship. She flew as a missionary pilot in Africa until she retired in 1994 at age 65. At MAF, Jordan flew the Cessna 404 and Beech 99, and also instructed Cessna 402 pilots in Tanzania, and Partenavia pilots in Madagascar. She was on the board of directors of Mission Aviation Fellowship from 1996 until 2001.

Jordan was the first woman in Canada to achieve the Airline Transport Rating (ATR). She retired from her flight career with over 17,000 hours. In 2012 she was named the recipient of the Flight Operations/Maintenance Award by the Northern Lights Award Event.

Jordan died in on September 3, 2013, at the age of 84.
