= Justice Jordan =

Justice Jordan may refer to:

- James Jordan (Indiana judge) (1842–1912), associate justice of the Indiana Supreme Court
- Robert H. Jordan (1916–1992), associate justice of the Supreme Court of Georgia

== See also ==
Judge Jordan (disambiguation)
