= Ken Jordan =

Ken Jordan may refer to:

- Ken Jordan (American football) (born 1964), former linebacker in the National Football League
- Ken Jordan (basketball) (1912–1994), American professional basketball player
- Ken Jordan (musician), American electronic musician with The Crystal Method
