= Catheleen Jordan =

- Born: June 1, 1947 (age 79)
- Education: University of California, Berkeley
- Scientific career
- Fields: Social work
- Workplaces: University of Texas at Arlington

Catheleen Jordan has been a Professor of Social Work at the University of Texas at Arlington School of Social Work since 1994.

== Achievements ==
- 2017 National Association of Social Workers, Pioneer Award.
- 2013, National Association of Social Workers-Texas, Lifetime Achievement Award.
- 2011-2016 Cheryl Milkes Moore Professorship in Mental Health.
- 2007-2009, President of the Texas chapter of the National Association of Social Workers.
- 1991-1996 Director, Community Service Clinic, University of Texas Arlington.

== Selected writings ==
- Collins, Don; Jordan, Catheleen; Coleman, Heather (2009). An Introduction to Family Social Work (3 ed.). Belmont, California: Brooks/Cole. ISBN 978-0-495-60188-3.
- Janzen, Curtis; Harris, Oliver; Jordan, Catheleen; Franklin, Cynthia (2005). Family Treatment: Evidence-Based Practice with Populations at Risk (4 ed.). Belmont, California: Brooks/Cole. ISBN 978-0-534-64145-0.
- Jordan, Catheleen; Franklin, Cynthia (2003). Clinical Assessment for Social Workers: Quantitative and Qualitative Methods (2 ed.). Chicago: Lyceum Books. ISBN 978-0-925065-37-7.
- Franklin, Cynthia; Jordan, Catheleen (1998). Family Practice: Brief Systems Methods for Social Work. Belmont, California: Brooks/Cole. ISBN 978-0-534-16182-8.
