= Karl Jordan =

Karl Jordan may refer to:

- Karl Jordan (footballer)
- Karl Jordan (zoologist, born 1861)
- Karl Jordan (zoologist, born 1888), also an Olympic gymnast

== See also ==
- Carl Jordan (disambiguation)
