= Terry Jordan =

Terry Jordan may refer to:

- Terry Jordan (Canadian writer), fiction writer, musician, essaying, and dramatist
- Terry Jordan (horse racing), see Dominion Day Stakes
- Terry Jordan, host on WFNC (AM)
- Terry G. Jordan-Bychkov (1938–2003), Author, Professor at the Department of Geography and the Environment at University of Texas at Austin.
