= Federico Jordan =

Mexican visual artist

- Born: April 2, 1969 (age 56); Torreón, Coahuila. Mexico
- Occupations: Visual artist, professor

Federico Jordán-Gómez (born April 2, 1969 in Torreón, Coahuila) is a visual artist. His work has been published in Forbes, Harvard Business Review, The New Yorker and The Wall Street Journal among others.

He received formal training from the Academy of San Carlos in Mexico City and completed his graduate studies from Autonomous University of Nuevo León in Monterrey, Nuevo León, Mexico. He was a professor in the faculty of Visual Arts at the Autonomous University of Nuevo León and lives in Saltillo and Paredón, Coahuila, México.
