= Jacob Jordan =

Canadian politician

Jacob Jordan (September 19, 1741 – February 23, 1796) was a seigneur, businessman and political figure in Quebec and Lower Canada.

He was born in England in 1741 and came to Canada in 1761 or earlier. He was an agent at Montreal for a London-based firm that supplied provisions for British troops in North America. His business partner at Quebec was Colin Drummond, father of General Sir Gordon Drummond. Jordan held lands in New Brunswick and Vermont. He expanded into the grain trade and also became agent for the Saint-Maurice ironworks. In 1767, he married Ann Livingston; they had ten children. In 1776, he was named deputy paymaster general. In 1784, he purchased the seigneury of Terrebonne, which included gristmills valuable to Jordan for the production of flour, from Pierre-Paul Margane de Lavaltrie. He was also partner in the operation of a tobacco factory, the Montreal Distilling Company and a bakery at Montreal. He also became involved in the fur trade, in competition with the North West Company. Jordan represented Effingham County in the 1st Parliament of Lower Canada.

He died at Saint-Louis-de-Terrebonne (later Terrebonne) in 1796, while still in office.

His son Jacob represented Effingham in the legislative assembly from 1796 to 1800.
