= Amy B. Jordan (media investigator) =

Amy B. Jordan (born November 23, 1961) is a Professor and Chair of Journalism and Media Studies at Rutgers University. Her research and teaching focuses on the role of media in the lives of children and their families, and the potential for communication messages to address health risk behaviors.

Previously, she had been the Associate Dean for Undergraduate Studies at the Annenberg School for Communication at the University of Pennsylvania.

Dr. Jordan received her M.A. (1986) and PhD. (1990) from the Annenberg School for Communication, and graduated summa cum laude and Phi Beta Kappa from Muhlenberg College in 1983 with a B.A. in Communication Studies.

== Awards ==
Fellow, International Communication Association (2017). Elected Fellow at the International Communication Association’s Annual Meeting in San Diego, California.

Senior Scholar Award (2016). Presented by the Children, Adolescents, and Media Division of the International Communication Association at the Annual Meeting in Fukuoka, Japan.

Alumni Achievement Award. (2014). Muhlenberg College, Allentown, Pennsylvania. This award is given to an alumnus/a for distinguished and excellent attainments in a specific field which reflects substantial credit on Muhlenberg College as the recipient’s alma mater.

Provost’s Award for Teaching Excellence by a Member of the Non-Standing Faculty. (2014). Awarded to two members of the associated faculty or academic support staff who teach at Penn, one in the non-health schools and one in the health school. Teaching recognition awarded through University of Pennsylvania’s Office of the Provost.

Stanley L. Saxton Applied Research Award (2002) from the National Communication Association and the Carl R. Couch Center. Awarded for co-authored paper (with Emory Woodard, Jessica Fishman and Ronda Scantlin) entitled: “Systems theory and the evaluation of media policy: Lessons from an assessment of the V-Chip mandate.”

== Publications ==
- Bleakley, A., Ellithorpe, M. E., Jordan, A. B., Hennessy, M., & Stevens, R. (2022). A content analysis of sports and energy drink advertising. Appetite, 174, 106010.
- Katz, V. S., Jordan, A. B., & Ognyanova, K. (2021). Digital inequality, faculty communication, and remote learning experiences during the COVID-19 pandemic: A survey of US undergraduates. Plos one, 16(2), e0246641.
- Jordan, A. B., Bleakley, A., Alber, J. M., Lazovich, D., & Glanz, K. (2020). Developing and testing message strategies to reduce indoor tanning. American journal of health behavior, 44(3), 292–301.
- Jordan, A. B., & Vaala, S. E. (2019). Educational media for children. In Media Effects (pp. 290–307). Routledge.
- Lemish, D., Jordan, A., & Rideout, V. (Eds.) (2017). Children, adolescents, and media: The future of research and action. NY: Routledge.
- Jordan, A. (2017). Growing up online: Media use and development in early adolescence. In Vorderer, P., Hefner, D., Reinecke, L., & Klimmt, C. (Eds.) Permanently Online, Permanently Connected. London, England: Taylor & Francis.
- Vaala, S. & Jordan, A. (2017). Children’s learning in a mobile media environment: Policies, practices, and possibilities. In Blumberg, F. & Brooks, P. (Eds.) Cognitive Development in Digital Contexts. NY: Elsevier Press.
- Jordan, A., Bleakley, A., Hennessy, M., & Vaala, S. (2015). Sugar-sweetened beverage-related public service advertisements and their influence on parents. American Behavioral Scientist, 59(14)1847-1865.
- Jordan, A.B. (2016). Digital media use and the experiences(s) of childhood. Journal of Communication, 66(6), p. 879-887.
- Victor C. Strasburger, Barbara J. Wilson, Jordan, Amy B. (2013). Children, Adolescents, and the Media Third edition. Thousand Oaks: Sage Publications
- Jordan, Amy B. (June 2004). "The Role of Media in Children's Development: An Ecological Perspective". Journal of Developmental & Behavioral Pediatrics. 25 (3): 196–206. doi:10.1097/00004703-200406000-00009. PMID 15194905. S2CID 40688321.
- Jordan, Amy B.; Calvert, Sandra L.; Cocking, Rodney R. (2002). Children in the Digital Age: Influences of Electronic Media on Development. Praeger Publishers. ISBN 0-275-97652-1.
- Jordan, Amy B.; Kathleen Hall Jamieson (1998). Children and television. Annals of the American Academy of Political and Social Science v. 557. Thousand Oaks, CA: Sage Publications.
- Jordan, Amy B. (Dec 1992). "Social Class, Temporal Orientation, and Mass Media Use within the Family System". Critical Studies in Mass Communication. 9 (4): 374–386. doi:10.1080/15295039209366840.
