= Jacob Jordan (soldier) =

Canadian politician (1770–1829)

Jacob Jordan (March 31, 1770 – 1829) was a seigneur, soldier, businessman and political figure in Lower Canada. He represented Effingham in the Legislative Assembly of Lower Canada from 1796 to 1800.

He was born in Montreal, the son of Jacob Jordan and Ann Livingston. Jordan served in the British infantry, reaching the rank of lieutenant-colonel. In 1793, he married Catherine Grant. Jordan inherited the seigneury of Terrebonne from his father in 1796, owning it until 1802. In 1797, he retired from the army on half-pay. Jordan was involved in the grain trade and in exporting goods. He also served as justice of the peace. Jordan did not run for reelection to the assembly in 1800. Later in life, he served as governor of an island in the West Indies. He died in England.

His wife's sister Ann married Samuel Gerrard.
