= Zoe Jordan =

Irish fashion designer

Zoe Jordan is an Irish fashion designer. She studied architecture and business before embarking on a career as a bond trader in New York for HSBC and later an equity sales-trader at Credit Suisse. After years on Wall Street, she left the world of finance behind in order to pursue her real passion, fashion design. Her eponymous brand launched in London in 2011 and went on to be winner of several awards.

Jordan has garnered many awards, accolades and global recognition for her pioneering designs. She has been the winner of Elle Talent Launchpad, a Walpole Brand of tomorrow, twice finalist for the prestigious British Fashion Council (BFC) Vogue designer fashion fund and winner of the BFC eBay Contemporary award.

She began showing on schedule at London Fashion Week in 2011. Sir Stuart Rose, Brit Smith Start, Natalie Imbruglia, and Sir Harold Tillman all attended. She then moved to show in New York to expand the empire in 2014, where she described her collection "It's a tribute to the grown-up tomboy in her urban environment with an energetic minimalism and international heritage”.

In 2013, Jordan was short listed for the British Fashion Council Vogue Fashion Fund award.

She is a daughter of the former F1 Team Owner, Eddie Jordan.

== Awards ==
- Winner of Elle Talent Launchpad 2010
- Winner of Walpole Brand of Tomorrow 2011
- BFC Vogue Designer fashion fund finalist 2012
- BFC Vogue Designer fashion fund finalist 2014
- BFC eBay Contemporary award winner

== Collaborations ==
- River Island: Zoë Jordan collaborated with River Island for their Design Forum project 2015. Jordan said "To get an insight to this side of the world of fashion, it's been a great learning experience, one I've relished. I love the fact the family are still involved in running River Island and they do a lot of British manufacturing. We are all about a more subtle sophistication rather than shouting the loudest."
