= Brian Jordan (disambiguation) =

Brian Jordan (born 1967) is an American baseball and football player.

Brian Jordan may also refer to:

- Brian Jordan (footballer) (1932–2018), English footballer
- Brian Jordan Jr. (born 1992), American actor
- Brian Matthew Jordan, American historian

== See also ==
- Bryan Jordan (born 1985), American soccer player
