= Larry N. Jordan =

Larry Neal Jordan (born October 11, 1952) is an American magazine publisher and journalist, syndicated radio show producer, and book author. A commercial newspaper publisher from the age of 15, Jordan is best known as a biographer of American country and western music star Jim Reeves.

== Press-American ==
Larry Jordan's interest in journalism began in 1963, when he received a small printing press as a Christmas gift from his parents. The boy started a newspaper for his Cedar Rapids, Iowa neighborhood as a hobby and stuck with the task long enough to develop a basic understanding of the publishing business.

In September 1968, while still a 15-year-old high school student, Jordan decided to try his hand at launching a citywide newspaper. Bankrolled with a $50 loan from his mother, Jordan launched an 8-page tabloid, the Cedar Rapids Press-American, with physical production handled by a local job printer. The publication rapidly gained readership and advertiser acceptance and grew, to the point where by 1972 the paper had become one of the largest-selling non-daily newspapers in the state of Iowa, running 28 pages in length and produced by a part-time staff of seven. The paper's total circulation in 1972 exceeded 11,500.

The Press-American covered serious news involving local schools and government and gained public notice over an investigative series written by Jordan pitting the non-parentally authorized psychological testing of school children against privacy rights. A statewide meeting of public school psychologists resulted from the public debate springing up over the issue and Iowa state Senator Tom Riley became actively involved in the issue, making the acquaintance of the young publisher and serving as his political mentor.

== Kirkwood and politics ==
At 21, Jordan joined the staff of the fledgling Kirkwood Community College. His work as a technical grants writer brought over $4 million into the college's coffers, including helping to fund KCCK-FM, an award-winning student radio station.

Jordan also became involved in the political process, working as a speech writer and issues strategist in the Congressional campaign of Tom Riley. He later played a similar role in the more successful Congressional campaign of Tom Tauke, before becoming the Executive Director of the Linn County Republican Party. Jordan doubled fundraising goals, raising enough money for the party to field a whole slate of candidates for state office. Describing an event Jordan held, the Cedar Rapids Gazette reported

"it exuded class. Cadillacs and Continentals were prominent in the parking lot. The guest list was most impressive. The major law firms were represented, as was the medical fraternity. Just about every Cedar Rapids businessman of note either bought tickets or was there in person.... The 400 or so personages who packed the Longbranch ate a special menu and drank wine by candlelight as a quartet of musicians played... The whole affair was choreographed by program chairman Larry Jordan...[whose] concept proved successful."

== Front Lines and Midwest Today ==
In 1981, Jordan became the publisher and editor of Front Lines, a monthly tabloid newspaper delivered free to the homes of more than 50,000 Cedar Rapidians. He subsequently moved to Florida, where he did freelance writing for about five years before returning to Iowa and becoming a publisher again.

In 1992, Larry Jordan launched a glossy regional magazine called Midwest Today, for which he still serves as editor and publisher. His wife, Julie Campbell-Jordan, is associate publisher and heads advertising sales. The magazine offers feature articles, interviews with prominent individuals, and investigative reports. Among the magazine's significant stories was one penned by Jordan himself that attracted nationwide attention, called "The Secret JFK Files, New Evidence and the Midwest Connection." It took almost a year to write and included interviews with sources overlooked by the Warren Commission in its report. A 12-page "think piece" Jordan wrote called "The Troubling Legacy of Ronald Reagan" attracted the attention of then-Gov. Bill Clinton as he was embarking on his successful campaign for the Presidency. Clinton was so intrigued by it he met with Jordan, and then sent him a letter calling the story "very impressive," saying "I'm glad I had the opportunity to read it," and "I agree with much of it, as you may guess." Commenting on a different article by Jordan, U.S. Secretary of State Hillary Clinton wrote " your analysis and argument hits the mark. I only wish others paid more attention to the evidence which is there for all to see of what is really happening."

In 1997, Jordan launched a weekly show on AM radio station WMT in Cedar Rapids called the Midwest Today Radio Edition based on the contents of the magazine. The program is now carried by 52 stations across 10 states.

== Music industry work ==
In 1998, Jordan wrote the 7,000-word booklet that accompanied the Bear Family Jim Reeves And Friends: Radio Days, Vol. 1 4-CD boxed set In 1999, an effort lauded by Thom Jurek of All Music Guide as work of "priceless documentation."

In 2000 Jordan co-produced and wrote the liner notes for the Soundies/BMG CD Jim Reeves Unreleased Hits, consisting of overdubs that had been done by the singer's widow, Mary, but which until that time had not been issued.

In 2003, Jordan launched an indie label, VoiceMasters, which has issued CDs featuring previously unreleased recordings by Reeves, with as well as other artists. One of the Jim Reeves tracks — the last song Jim ever recorded, called "I'm A Hit Again" — was released as a single and skyrocketed to #1 on the "Hot Disc" chart in the UK (a survey of radio stations in England, Ireland and Scotland), where it remained for 7 weeks in late 2008. In conjunction with H&H Music in the UK, Jordan also released a Jim Reeves Anthology DVD in 2010, which was revised in 2014 with more live video performances by Reeves. He wrote an essay for a book called American Music Legends by Grand Ole Opry photographer [Les Leverett. Later that same year, Jordan served as a consultant on a BBC Four production called "Kings of Country."

In late 2011, Page Turner Books released a 672-page book called Jim Reeves: His Untold Story by Larry Jordan, about the life of the country music singer. The book took Jordan more than 13 years to complete and is based on hundreds of interviews plus Reeves' personal diaries and private correspondence. Billboard magazine, in an interview with Jordan, reported that "Though the author is a Reeves fan, he didn't put the singer on a pedestal... The book is a balanced account of Reeves' life and career, his marriage to Mary...and his penchant for the opposite sex that might not have meshed with his 'Gentleman Jim' persona. However, Jordan spends a lot of time discussing what made Reeves fans all over the world: the music."

Jordan won a Hollywood Book Award in 2012 , an Award for Excellence In Historical Recorded Sound Research from the Association of Recorded Sound Collections and numerous other accolades. In 2013, Larry Jordan produced a CD called "The Divine Ms. Cline" featuring new overdubs of Patsy Cline studio tracks, using pro musicians from Nashville, Atlanta and elsewhere. Billboard magazine called the results "stunning" . In 2014, Jordan produced an 8-CD set, "The Great Jim Reeves," which included 170 tracks, over 90 overdubs, plus a 48-page booklet he co-authored with his daughter, Sara Elizabeth Jordan, also a professional writer. Billboard magazine reported "the releases have sold well in the United States and abroad" and cited England, India, Germany and South Africa. That same year, Larry Jordan was interviewed on an hour-long tribute to Jim Reeves hosted by Terry Wogan, broadcast in the UK on BBC Radio 2, said to have been heard by 12 million people. David Allan, writing in Country Music People magazine in the UK, said of the 8-CD set that "The production is contemporary, technically impressive and hugely enjoyable. It really is quite extraordinary, and at times breathtaking, how [Larry Jordan] brought Jim Reeves up to date without losing the unique Reeves appeal." Famed Irish singers Daniel O'Donnell and his singing partner, Mary Duff are appearing in a series of TV commercials promoting "The Great Jim Reeves" set.

In recent years, Larry Jordan has not only produced a series of releases for his own label, VoiceMasters, but also overdubbed CDs on other artists for H&H Music Ltd. in London including "Bing Crosby and Rosemary Clooney: The New Recordings"; and 2015's "Elvis Presley: The New Recordings".

Jordan has also produced two CDs for Mint Audio in the UK , including "Rosemary Clooney: Rare & Unreleased", about which respected critic Joe Marchese of The Second Disc music site observed, "Happily, Jordan’s new orchestral settings are tasteful, well-executed and thankfully free of modern touches... Clooney’s voice is front and center throughout, and at its most pristine. Rare and Unreleased makes for an enjoyable hour-plus with one of the greatest voices of the American songbook." The latest Jordan-produced CD for Mint is "Barbra Streisand In the Beginning," the latter of which debuts 21 recordings done in 1962 but never commercially available, with live performance tracks recorded in stereo at the famed Bon Soir nightclub in New York City, unissued audition demos Streisand did for RCA that same year, along with 4 additional rare tracks. He has plans for future CD projects on pop and country artists.
