= Carl F. Jordan =

American academic

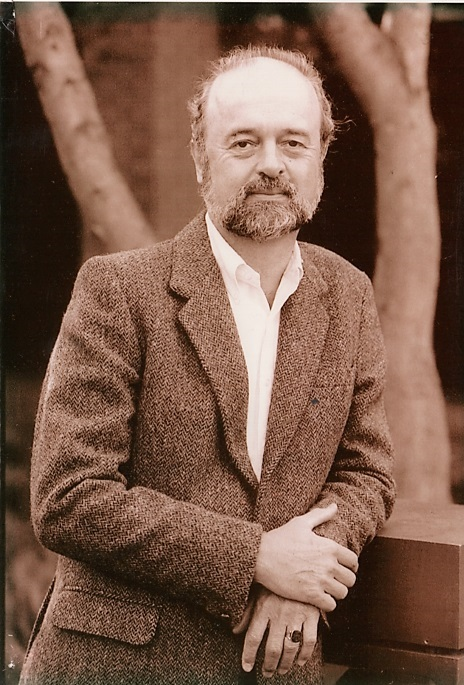

Academic background
- Education: Rutgers University

Carl F. Jordan is Professor Emeritus, Odum School of Ecology, University of Georgia.

== Education ==
Jordan graduated with a B.Sc. from the University of Michigan in 1958. From 1958 to 1962 he served in the U.S. Navy as a Combat Information Center Officer. In 1962, he enrolled in graduate school at Rutgers University and received his M.Sc. in Plant Ecology in 1964. He acquired his Ph.D. in 1966.

== Career ==
Jordan joined Howard Odum in an Atomic Energy Commission project in Puerto Rico in 1966 and applied the cycling concept to the dynamics of radioactive isotopes in the rain forest, for which he was awarded the Ecological Society of America’s Mercer award. In 1969, Jordan moved to Argonne National Laboratory where he continued to study radioactive pollution from nuclear power plants around Lake Michigan. In 1974, he led a project for the University of Georgia near San Carlos de Río Negro in the Amazon Region of Venezuela. During this time he focused on determining how forests of the Amazon survived on the nutrient-poor soils and could even flourish and support shifting cultivation. His research showed that nutrients from decaying organic matter on the forest floor recycled directly back into the roots of living trees. As long as the cycle was intact, the forest flourished, but destruction by agriculture or grazing cut the cycle and destroyed productive capacity.

In 1980, he returned to the University of Georgia. He began taking graduate students, while continuing his research in San Carlos, and expanding it to Brazil, Ecuador, and Thailand. Most notable projects were studies in Brazil of the Jari Plantation in Brazil, a pulp plantation of hundreds of square miles, and rehabilitation of the forests around the Carajas mines in central Amazonia. The primary concentration in all these studies was the importance of preserving the soil organic matter to keep the nutrient cycle intact and functioning.

In 1993, Jordan acquired a farm near Athens Georgia that had once been part of a pre-Civil cotton plantation and began research on more sustainable ways to manage organic agriculture. He originated the first University course in Georgia on organic farming, and opened the farm to tours and classes interested in sustainable agriculture. By 2017, more than 20,000 students had toured the farm. Jordan retired as Professor Emeritus in 2009.

== Bibliography- Books ==
1. Jordan, C.F. (1981). Benchmark Papers in Tropical Ecology. Jordan, Carl F. Stroudsburg, Pa.: Hutchinson Ross Pub. Co. ISBN 978-0879333980. OCLC 7553921.
2. Jordan, C.F. (1985). Nutrient Cycling in Tropical Forest Ecosystems. Chichester: Wiley. ISBN 0-471-90449-X. OCLC 48135421.
3. Jordan, C.F. (1987). Amazon Rain Forests: Ecosystem Disturbance and Recovery. New York: Springer-Verlag. ISBN 0-387-96397-9. OCLC 14166840.
4. Jordan, C.F. (1989). An Amazonian Rain Forest. The Structure of Function of a Stressed Ecosystem and the Impact of Slash and Burn Agriculture. Man and the Biosphere Series, Volume 2. Paris, France: UNESCO. ISBN 9780940813823. OCLC 19589904.
5. Jordan, C.F. (1992). Taungya : forest plantations with agriculture in Southeast Asia. Wallingford, Oxon, UK: C.A.B. International. ISBN 978-0851988016. OCLC 27728371.
6. Jordan, C.F. (1995) Conservation: Replacing Quantity with Quality as a Goal for Global Management. (Textbook). Wiley, N.Y.
7. Jordan, C. F. (1998). Working with nature : resource management for sustainability. Amsterdam: Harwood Academic Publishers. ISBN 90-5702-542-6. OCLC 40341824.
8. Castellanet, Christian (2002). Participatory action research in natural resource management : a critique of the method based on five years' experience in the Transamazônica Region of Brazil. Carl F. Jordan editor. UK: Taylor & Francis. ISBN 0-203-50856-4. OCLC 252930016.
9. Montagnini F. and C.F. Jordan. (2005) Tropical Forest Ecology: The Basis for Management and Conservation. Springer Verlag, Berlin
10. Jordan, C. F. (2013). An Ecosystem Approach to Sustainable Agriculture: Energy Use Efficiency in the American South. Springer Verlag. Heidelberg
11. Jordan, C. F. (2021). Evolution from a Thermodynamic Perspective. Switzerland: Springer Nature. ISBN 978-3-030-85185-9. OCLC 1260664569.

== Selected Articles and Book Chapters ==
1. Jordan, Carl F. (1968). "A Simple, Tension-Free Lysimeter". Soil Science. 105 (2): 81–86. Bibcode:1968SoilS.105...81J. doi:10.1097/00010694-196802000-00003. ISSN 0038-075X. S2CID 95561901.
2. Kline, J. R.; Jordan, C. F. (1968-05-03). "Tritium Movement in Soil of Tropical Rain Forest". Science. 160 (3827): 550–551. Bibcode:1968Sci...160..550K. doi:10.1126/science.160.3827.550. ISSN 0036-8075. PMID 5644064. S2CID 42112484.
3. Jordan, Carl F. (1969-07-01). "Derivation of Leaf-Area Index from Quality of Light on the Forest Floor". Ecology. 50 (4): 663–666. doi:10.2307/1936256. ISSN 1939-9170. JSTOR 1936256.
4. Jordan, C. F.; Koranda, J. J.; Kline, J. R.; Martin, J. R. (1970-07-15). "Tritium Movement in a Tropical Ecosystem". BioScience. 20 (14): 807–812. doi:10.2307/1295095. ISSN 0006-3568. JSTOR 1295095.
5. Jordan, Carl F. (1971). "Productivity of a Tropical Forest and its Relation to a World Pattern of Energy Storage". Journal of Ecology. 59 (1): 127–142. doi:10.2307/2258457. JSTOR 2258457.
6. Jordan, Carl F. (1971). "A World Pattern in Plant Energetics: Studies of the productive potential of natural ecosystems yield insight into how plants use solar energy and how world patterns of energy use could have evolved". American Scientist. 59 (4): 425–433. ISSN 0003-0996. JSTOR 27829697.
7. Jordan, Carl F.; Kline, Jerry R.; Sasscer, Donald S. (1972). "Relative Stability of Mineral Cycles in Forest Ecosystems". The American Naturalist. 106 (948): 237–253. doi:10.1086/282764. ISSN 0003-0147. S2CID 83741372.
8. Jordan, Carl F.; Kline, Jerry R. (1976). "Strontium-90 in a Tropical Rain Forest: 12th-yr Validation of a 32-yr Prediction". Health Physics. 30 (2): 199–201. doi:10.1097/00004032-197602000-00007. ISSN 0017-9078. PMID 1245419.
9. Jordan, Carl F.; Kline, Jerry R. (1977). "Transpiration of Trees in a Tropical Rainforest". Journal of Applied Ecology. 14 (3): 853–860. doi:10.2307/2402816. JSTOR 2402816.
10. Jordan, Carl F.; Murphy, Peter G. (1978). "A Latitudinal Gradient of Wood and Litter Production, and Its Implication Regarding Competition and Species Diversity in Trees". American Midland Naturalist. 99 (2): 415. doi:10.2307/2424817. JSTOR 2424817.
11. Stark, Nellie M.; Jordan, Carl F. (1978). "Nutrient Retention by the Root Mat of an Amazonian Rain Forest". Ecology. 59 (3): 434–437. doi:10.2307/1936571. JSTOR 1936571.
12. Herrera, R.; Merida, Tatiana; Stark, Nellie; Jordan, C. F. (1978). "Direct phosphorus transfer from leaf litter to roots". Naturwissenschaften. 65 (4): 208–209. Bibcode:1978NW.....65..208H. doi:10.1007/bf00450594. ISSN 0028-1042. S2CID 28084273.
13. Jordan, Carl F.; Escalante, Gladys (1980-02-01). "Root Productivity in an Amazonian Rain Forest". Ecology. 61 (1): 14–18. doi:10.2307/1937148. ISSN 1939-9170. JSTOR 1937148.
14. Herrera, Rafael; Jordan, Carl F; Medina, Ernesto; Klinge, Hans (1981). "How Human Activities Disturb the Nutrient Cycles of a Tropical Rainforest in Amazonia". Ambio. 10 (2/3): 109–114. JSTOR 4312652.
15. Jordan, C.; Caskey, W.; Escalante, G.; Herrera, R.; Montagnini, F.; Todd, R.; Uhl, C. (1982). "The nitrogen cycle in a 'Terra Firme' rainforest on oxisol in the Amazon territory of Venezuela / Ciclo de nitrógeno de un bosque pluvial de Tierra Firme sobre oxisol en el Territorio Amazonas de Venezuela". Plant and Soil. 67 (1/3): 325–332. doi:10.1007/BF02182779. ISSN 0032-079X. JSTOR 42934047. S2CID 22490722.
16. Jordan, Carl F.; Herrera, Rafael (1981). "Tropical Rain Forests: Are Nutrients Really Critical?". The American Naturalist. 117 (2): 167–180. doi:10.1086/283696. JSTOR 2460498. S2CID 85215702.
17. Jordan, Carl F. (1982). "Amazon Rain Forests: Although similar in structure to forests in other regions, Amazon rain forests function very differently, with important implications for forest management". American Scientist. 70 (4): 394–401. JSTOR 27851547.
18. Jordan, Carl F. (1982-06-01). "The Nutrient Balance of an Amazonian Rain Forest". Ecology. 63 (3): 647–654. doi:10.2307/1936784. ISSN 1939-9170. JSTOR 1936784.
19. Smathers, Webb M.; Jordan, Carl F.; Farnworth, Edward G.; Tidrick, Thomas H. (1983). "An Economic Production-Function Approach to Ecosystem Management". BioScience. 33 (10): 642–646. doi:10.2307/1309493. JSTOR 1309493.
20. Uhl, Christopher; Jordan, Carl F. (1984). "Succession and Nutrient Dynamics Following Forest Cutting and Burning in Amazonia". Ecology. 65 (5): 1476–1490. doi:10.2307/1939128. JSTOR 1939128.
21. Jordan, C.F. (1986). Ecological knowledge and environmental problem-solving : concepts and case studies. National Research Council (U.S.). Committee on Applications of Ecological Theory to Environmental Problems. Washington, DC: National Academy Press. pp. 345–357. ISBN 978-0309036450. OCLC 42328934.
22. Jordan, C.F. (1986). "Ecological Effects of Nuclear Radiation". Ecological Knowledge and Environmental Problem-Solving: Concepts and Case Studies. Washington, DC: National Academy Press. pp. 331–344. ISBN 978-0309036450. OCLC 42328934.
23. Jordan, C.F.; Miller, C. (1996). "Scientific Uncertainty as a Constraint to Environmental Problem-Solving: Large Scale Ecosystems.". Scientific uncertainty and environmental problem solving. Lemons, John. Cambridge, Mass.: Blackwell Science. pp. 91–117. ISBN 978-0865424760. OCLC 32968916.
24. Jordan, Carl F. (2002). "Genetic Engineering, the Farm Crisis, and World Hunger". BioScience. 52 (6): 523–529. doi:10.1641/0006-3568(2002)052[0523:GETFCA]2.0.CO;2. ISSN 0006-3568.
25. Jordan, C. F. (2004), "Organic farming and agroforestry: Alleycropping for mulch production for organic farms of southeastern United States", New Vistas in Agroforestry, Advances in Agroforestry, vol. 1, Dordrecht: Springer Netherlands, pp. 79–90, doi:10.1007/978-94-017-2424-1_6, ISBN 978-90-481-6673-2
26. Carrillo, Yolima; Ball, Becky A.; Bradford, Mark A.; Jordan, Carl F.; Molina, Marirosa (2011). "Soil fauna alter the effects of litter composition on nitrogen cycling in a mineral soil". Soil Biology and Biochemistry. 43 (7): 1440–1449. doi:10.1016/j.soilbio.2011.03.011. ISSN 0038-0717.
27. Carrillo, Yolima; Jordan, Carl F.; Jacobsen, Krista L.; Mitchell, Kathryn G.; Raber, Patrick (2011-03-16). "Shoot pruning of a hedgerow perennial legume alters the availability and temporal dynamics of root-derived nitrogen in a subtropical setting". Plant and Soil. 345 (1–2): 59–68. doi:10.1007/s11104-011-0760-8. ISSN 0032-079X. S2CID 24722537.
28. Jordan, Carl F. (2016-12-01). "The Farm as a Thermodynamic System: Implications of the Maximum Power Principle". BioPhysical Economics and Resource Quality. 1 (2) 9. doi:10.1007/s41247-016-0010-z. ISSN 2366-0112.
29. Jordan, Carl F. (2019). "Energy Flow and Feedback Control in Ecological and Economic Food Systems". Ecological Economics. 156: 91–97. doi:10.1016/j.ecolecon.2018.09.015. ISSN 0921-8009. S2CID 158460618.

== Courses Taught at the School of Ecology, University of Georgia ==
- Tropical Ecological and Cultural Systems (1993-2000) (originated course)
- Agroforestry/ Agroecology (1995-2004) (originated course)
- Principles of Conservation Ecology and Sustainable Development II. (co instructor, (1994-2000)
- Conservation Seminar (2000-2009)
- Senior Seminar (1999-2002)
- Fertility and Pest Management in Organic Agriculture. co-instructor, (2007-2008)
- Organic Agriculture (2004-2013) (originated course)

== Membership in Professional & Environmental Organizations ==
- Sigma Xi

== Selected Awards and Recognition ==
- 1973: Mercer Award, of the Ecological Society of America
- 2008: Purpose Prize Fellow
- 2011: Conservationist of the Year Award Oconee River Soil & Water Conservation District
