= Richard Jordan (disambiguation) =

Richard Jordan (1937–1993) was an American actor

Richard Jordan may also refer to:

- Richard Jordan (RAF officer) (1902–1994), English Royal Air Force pilot
- Richard Jordan (American football) (born 1974), American football player
- Richard Gerald Jordan (1946-2025), longtime American death row inmate
- Rick J. Jordan (born 1968), German music producer
