= Joseph Jordan =

Joseph or Joe Jordan may refer to:

- Joseph Jordan (Royal Navy officer), English naval officer
- Joe Jordan (born 1951), Scottish international football player and coach
- Joe Jordan (politician) (born 1958), Canadian politician
- Joe Jordan (musician) (1882–1971), ragtime and jazz musician
- Amos Jordan (1922–2018), often known by the nickname "Joe" Jordan, United States Army general
- Joseph A. Jordan Jr. (1924–1991), civil rights activist, lawyer and judge
- Joseph Jordania (born 1954), Australian-Georgian ethnomusicologist and evolutionary musicologist
- Joseph Jordan (doctor) (1787–1873), English medical doctor
- Joseph M. Jordan (1922–2014), American law enforcement officer
- Joe Jordan (hurler) (born 1987), Irish hurler
