= Paul Jordan =

Paul Jordan may refer to:

- Paul Jordan (artist) (1916–2006), Polish-American artist
- Paul T. Jordan (born 1941), American physician and mayor of Jersey City, New Jersey
- Paul Jordan (motorcyclist) (born 1991), Grand Prix motorcycle racer from Ireland

== See also ==
- Paul Jordan-Smith (1885–1971), American journalist, editor, and author
- Paul Jordaan (born 1992), South African rugby union footballer
