= Andrew Jordan =

Andrew or Andy Jordan may refer to:

- Andrew Jordan (American football) (born 1972), former NFL tight end
- Andrew Jordan (racing driver) (born 1989), English motor racing driver
- Andrew J. Jordan, British environmental policy scholar and professor
- Skull Duggery (rapper) (Andrew Jordan, 1971–2022), American rapper
- Andy Jordan (footballer) (born 1979), Scottish footballer
- Andy Jordan (TV personality) (born 1990), English musician and cast member of Made in Chelsea
