= Lorna Jordan =

American artist

Lorna Jordan (1954 - 2021) is an American artist known for her public artworks based on environmental themes. She died on 24 February 2021.

== Work ==
Her public artwork Bow Passage Overlook is located in the Pearce Estate Park in Calgary, Alberta.

Jordan's 1998 work Waterworks Gardens, a collaboration made visible the process of water processing at the Renton, Washington wastewater treatment plant.

Jordan's work is included in the collections of the Seattle Art Museum and the State of Washington.

In 2010, the City of Madison received a grant from the NEA Mayors’ Institute on City Design 25th Anniversary Initiative to work with Jordan in designing Madison's Central Park (now named McPike Park). The Jordan designed "Art Approach" included in the Central Park Master Plan includes a conceptual framework and outlines descriptions and locations of artworks to be integrated into Central Park's systems, connections and places. The design team also included Schreiber/Anderson Associates; Ken Saiki Design; and JJR, LLC.
