= Kevin Jordan =

Kevin Jordan may refer to:

- Kevin Jordan (American football) (born 1972), American football player
- Kevin Jordan (baseball) (born 1969), American baseball player
- Kevin Jordan (fighter) (born 1970), American mixed martial artist
- Kevin Jordan (filmmaker), director of the film Brooklyn Lobster
