= Tim Jordan =

Tim Jordan may refer to:

- Tim Jordan (American football) (born 1964), former linebacker in the National Football League
- Tim Jordan (baseball) (1879–1949), professional baseball player
- Tim Jordan (sociologist), British sociologist
- Timothy Jordan II (1981–2005), musician
