= Alexis Jordan (disambiguation) =

Alexis Jordan may refer to:

- Alexis Jordan (born 1992), American singer
  - Alexis Jordan (album)
- Alexis Jordan (swimmer) (born 1988), Barbadian swimmer

== See also ==
- Claude Thomas Alexis Jordan (1814–1897), French botanist and taxonomist
