= Mary Ranken Jordan =

- Born: 1869; Ireland
- Died: 1962 (aged 92–93); St. Louis, Missouri
- Spouse: Clay E. Jordan

Mary Ranken Jordan (1869–1962) was a prominent American philanthropist and an advocate of many charitable organizations. Mary Ranken was born in Ireland in 1869 and moved to the United States in 1885 to join her uncles in St Louis. Ranken came from a prosperous Irish Presbyterian family. Many of which founded or were involved in civic and charitable affairs. Ranken's uncle, David Ranken Jr. was the founder of the David Ranken Jr., School of Mechanical Trades, which is now known as Ranken Technical College.

At the age of 36, she married a St. Louis merchant, Clay E. Jordan. She and her husband became strong supporters of the community and are best known for establishing The Ranken-Jordan Home for Convalescent Crippled Children on April 9, 1941, in what is now Maryland Heights, Missouri. She was also the president of the St. Louis Women's Christian Association and the Memorial Home for the Elderly. Mary Ranken Jordan left a legacy of support for many charitable and cultural organizations before her death at the age of 93.
