= Fred Jordan =

Fred Jordan may refer to:

- Fred Jordan (baseball coach) (born c. 1958), college baseball coach
- Fred Jordan (singer) (1922–2002), English singer
- Fred Jordan (publisher) (1925–2021), Grove Press, Evergreen Review
- Fred Jordan (politician) (born 1974), member of the Oklahoma House of Representatives
