= Norm Jordan =

Australian rules footballer

Personal information
- Full name: Norman Robert Jordan
- Born: 30 August 1888; Prahran, Victoria
- Died: 8 November 1966 (aged 78); Bayswater, Victoria
- Original team: Caulfield
- Height: 180 cm (5 ft 11 in)
- Position: Ruckman

Playing career^{1}
Years	Club	Games (Goals)
1913	Melbourne	1 (0)
- ^{1} Playing statistics correct to the end of 1913.

Norman Robert Jordan (30 August 1888 – 8 November 1966) was an Australian rules footballer who played with Melbourne in the Victorian Football League (VFL). Great-grandfather of Dale Thomas.
