= Tony Jordan (disambiguation) =

Tony Jordan (born 1957), is a British television writer

Tony Jordan may also refer to:

- Tony Jordan (winemaker) (1944–2019); Australian winemaker
- Tony Jordan (politician) (born 1964), American politician
- Tony Jordan (American football) (born 1965), American football player

== See also ==
- Tony Jorden (1947–2023), English sportsman
- Antony Jordan (born 1974), American football linebacker
- Anthony Jordan (disambiguation)
