= Joanna Jordan (talent booker) =

British-born talent booker

Joanna Jordan is a British businesswoman and talent booker. She is the founder and chief executive of Central Talent Booking, a talent agency with offices in Los Angeles, New York City and London.

She began booking guests for the Channel 4 show The Word and other programmes on the station. Late Show with David Letterman recruited her to move to the United States to serve as the show's booker of celebrities. After working for the show between 1999 and 2005, she founded Central Talent Booking (CTB) in 1999. CTB books celebrity and human interest talent for various media.

== Career ==
=== Early career ===
Jordan's first job was as an au pair, after which she became a junior secretary for a stockbroker in London. She served as a secretary at the Today newspaper and then became a presenter for a short while on a children's television show related to fashion on TV-am. Jordan's next job was to book guests for The Word, a Channel 4 show, which led to work for shows hosted by Clive Anderson and Ruby Wax. Jordan also worked for Network 7 and Moviewatch. When Jordan was 27, she was hired as a talent booker by the Late Show with David Letterman and relocated to the United States.

=== Central Talent Booking ===
Central Talent Booking
- Company type: Private
- Founded: New York City, New York, U.S. (1 January 1999)
- Founder: Joanna Jordan
- Headquarters: New York City, New York
- Website: www.centraltalentbooking.com

Jordan held the booker job at the Late Show with David Letterman between 1999 and 2005, after which she founded her own company, Central Talent Booking (CTB), a talent agency based in New York, in 1999. When Jordan told the Late Show with David Letterman executives of her plans to start her own company, the show offered to be CTB's first customer, which Jordan accepted.

Central Talent Booking's office initially was Jordan's Little Italy, Manhattan, apartment at the intersection of Mulberry Street and Canal Street. By 2005, CTB grew to 20 bookers working full-time—16 women and four men—and had expanded to offices in Los Angeles, New York and London. CTB booked guests for O, The Oprah Magazine, The Early Show, Weekends at the D.L., Punk'd, A&E, the Discovery Channel, and XM Satellite Radio. It began booking celebrities for Jimmy Kimmel Live! in 2006. Cruise lines enlist the services of CTB to recruit celebrities to send off new ships. In 2003, Central Talent Booking signed a one-year contract with Discovery Networks U.S. where Jordan would contact celebrities she is connected to about whether they were open to taking part in any of the shows on Discovery Channel, Discovery Kids, TLC, Animal Planet, and Travel Channel.

Writing in The Guardian in 2002, journalist Emma Brockes called Jordan "one of New York's most respected talent bookers". Variety's Tatiana Siegel said in 2007 that Jordan "is considered one of the industry's premier bookers". In a 2008 article, TV Guide referred to Jordan as the "force behind" the "I'm F-ing Ben Affleck" video, and in the same article Jimmy Kimmel quipped, "I wish I'd had her in high school when I was looking for a date to the prom."
