= Jeffrey Jordan =

American basketball player and son of Michael Jordan

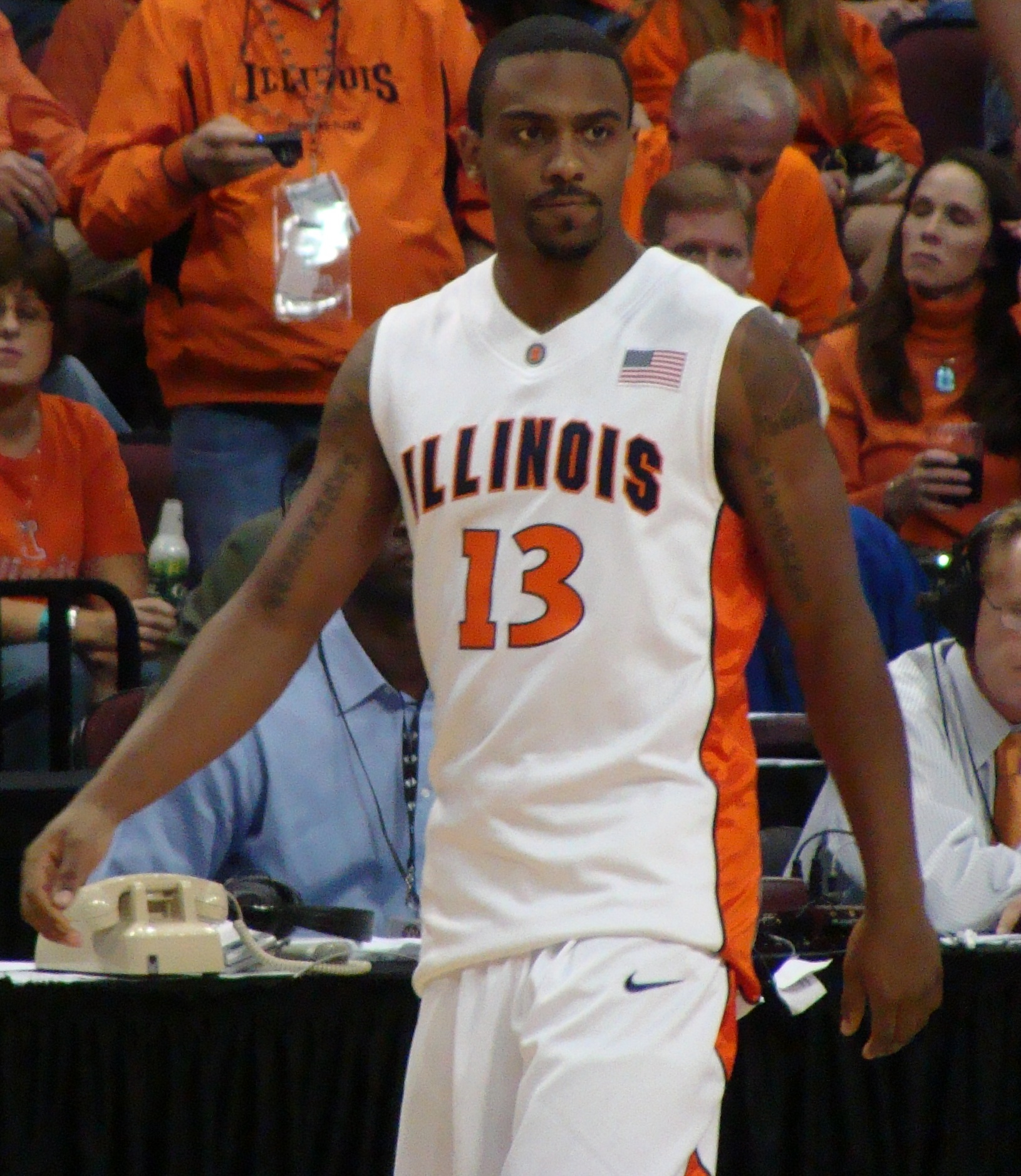
- Jordan in 2009

Personal information
- Born: November 18, 1988 (age 38) Chicago, Illinois, U.S.
- Listed height: 6 ft 1 in (1.85 m)
- Listed weight: 180 lb (82 kg)

Career information
- High school: Loyola Academy (Wilmette, Illinois)
- College: Illinois (2007–2010); UCF (2010–2012)
- Position: Point guard
- Stats at Basketball Reference

Jeffrey Michael Jordan (born November 18, 1988) is an American former basketball player who played for the University of Illinois and the University of Central Florida. The oldest child of basketball player Michael Jordan, he is the cofounder of Heir Jordan, a philanthropic foundation that he runs with his younger brother Marcus.

== High school ==
Jeffrey Jordan was the subject of local and national media attention as a high schooler, and had three of his high school games shown nationally on ESPN in 2007. At Loyola, he was a starter for three years and was All-Catholic League twice. He was chosen for the 2007 Jordan Brand Classic.

== College ==
Jordan graduated from Loyola Academy on May 26, 2007. He received scholarship offers from Valparaiso and Loyola University Chicago, and was actively recruited as a preferred walk-on by Davidson, Penn State, Northwestern, and the University of Illinois. Jordan decided to play as a preferred walk-on at the University of Illinois and enrolled at the university in 2007 as a psychology major with an academic scholarship. On January 22, 2009, it was announced by the university that Jordan would receive a full athletic scholarship.

On June 24, 2009, Jordan announced he was leaving the University of Illinois’ basketball team to focus on school and his "life after basketball". During the summer of 2009, he interned at Nike. Jordan later decided to return to the team, but after the 2009–10 season, he received a release to transfer to the University of Central Florida alongside his brother, Marcus.

In January 2012, Jordan left the UCF team for "personal reasons".

== Personal life ==
Jordan is the oldest child of Michael Jordan and his first wife, Juanita Vanoy, who married when Jeffrey was an infant and divorced when he was in high school, sharing custody of Jeffrey and siblings Marcus and Jasmine. Through his father's second wife he has twin half-sisters, Ysabel and Victoria (born February 9, 2014).

Jordan lives in Portland, Oregon, where he entered Nike, Inc.'s management-training program after college. In 2020, he co-founded the Jordan Avakian Group, a Chicago-based consultant group.

Jordan married Radina Aneva in May 2019.

On September 24, 2021, Jordan was arrested in Scottsdale, Arizona for assaulting hospital staff.

== In popular culture ==
In the 1996 film Space Jam, which starred Michael Jordan as himself, Jeffrey Jordan was portrayed by Manner Washington.
