= Hen Jordan =

American baseball player (1894-1948)

- Catcher
- Born: March 5, 1894; Harrisburg, Pennsylvania, U.S.
- Died: April 19, 1948 (aged 54); Harrisburg, Pennsylvania, U.S.
- Threw: Right

Negro league baseball debut
- 1922, for the Harrisburg Giants

Last appearance
- 1925, for the Harrisburg Giants
- Stats at Baseball Reference

Teams
- Harrisburg Giants (1922–1925); Baltimore Black Sox (1923)

William Henry Jordan (March 5, 1894 – April 19, 1948) was an American Negro league baseball catcher in the 1920s.

A native of Harrisburg, Pennsylvania, Jordan made his Negro leagues debut in 1922 for the Harrisburg Giants. He played four seasons for the club through 1925, while also playing briefly for the Baltimore Black Sox in 1923. Jordan died in Harrisburg in 1948 at age 54.
