= Frankie Jordan =

French singer (1938–2025)

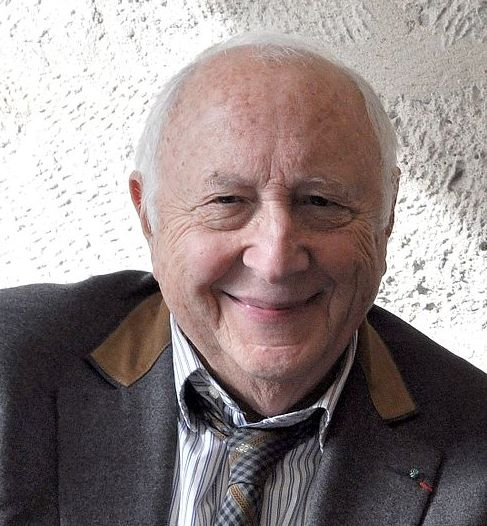
- Jordan in 2014

Background information
- Born: Claude Benzaquen; 19 July 1938; Oran, French Algeria
- Died: 3 June 2025 (aged 86)
- Genres: Pop
- Occupations: Singer, dentist
- Years active: 1960–1963
- Labels: Decca

Claude Benzaquen (19 July 1938 – 3 June 2025), known during his music career as Frankie Jordan, was a French rock and roll singer, later a dentist.

Born in Oran, Algeria, he moved as a child with his family to Casablanca, Morocco. He developed a love for jazz and blues music, and began playing piano in clubs in the style of Fats Domino, while studying to become a dentist. In 1960, he was discovered by Daniel Filipacchi of Decca Records, and recorded his first single, "Tu parles trop", a version of "You Talk Too Much". Arranged by Eddie Vartan, it was one of the first successful rock and roll records recorded in the French language. He followed it up with "Dieu merci elle m'aime aussi", a version of Ray Charles' song "Hallelujah I Love Her So". In February 1961 he appeared with Johnny Hallyday and Les Chaussettes Noires at the first international rock and roll festival held in Paris, at the Palais des Sports, which also featured Little Tony, Emile Ford, and Bobby Rydell. He continued to record successfully through 1961, and released "Panne d'essence", a version of Floyd Robinson's "Out of Gas". Originally intended as a duet with Gillian Hills, it was eventually recorded by Jordan with Eddie Vartan's sister Sylvie and became his biggest hit as well as launching Sylvie Vartan's career. Jordan also released a self-titled LP in 1961.

Throughout his relatively short career as a pop singer, Jordan maintained his studies, and in 1962 graduated with a dentistry qualification. He gave his last concert in 1963, before giving up his musical career. Thereafter, he practised as a dentist in Paris. In 1996, he was awarded the position of Chevalier in the Légion d’honneur, and in 2005 became an Officer in the Ordre des Arts et des Lettres.

Jordan died from cancer on 3 June 2025, at the age of 86.
