= Eddie Jack Jordan (artist) =

American artist

Eddie "Jack" Jordan Sr.
- Born: Eddie Jack Jordan; July 29, 1925; Wichita Falls, Texas
- Died: December 9, 1999 (aged 74); New Orleans, Louisiana
- Education: Langston University, Langston, Oklahoma, State University of Iowa, Iowa City, Iowa

Dr. Eddie "Jack" Jordan Sr. (1925–1999) was an African American artist who practiced during the mid to late 20th century, predominantly in the southern United States. In addition to his work as an artist, Jordan also was the head of the Department of Fine Arts at Southern University at New Orleans until his death in 1999.

== Personal life ==
Jordan was born in 1925 in Wichita Falls, Texas. He attended grade school in Ardmore, Oklahoma, where there was no art instructor for him to work with. Instead, he is said to have learned drawing on his own during these years. Later, when Jordan was a student in high school, his parents wanted him to pursue a career in medicine. Despite lacking parental approval, he decided to major in industrial arts at Langston University in Oklahoma.

Jordan married at a young age and had one son, Louisiana lawyer, Eddie Jack Jordan Jr.

On December 9, 1999, Eddie Jack Jordan was involved in a fatal car accident. On December 14 of that same year, The Southern University at New Orleans held a special program and funeral in their auditorium in his honor.

== Artistic career ==
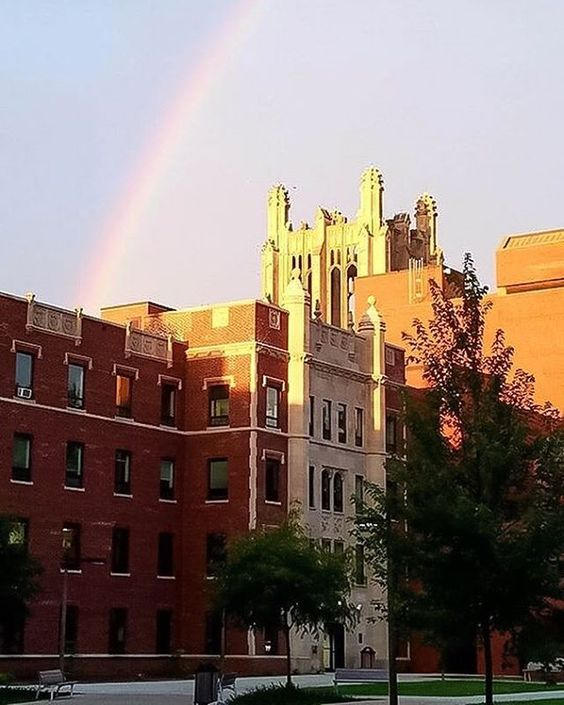
The University of Iowa in Iowa City, Iowa.

During the time of his undergraduate career, Jordan became fascinated with an instructor who drew while being accompanied by music. Jordan later recalled that the instructor had described this as a "painting recital." Jordan adopted this technique and held demonstrations across the country, using pastels on masonite, a musical selection of his choice, and a narration by his wife. A typical demonstration of this sort would last nearly a half-hour.

After successfully obtaining his bachelor's degree from Langston University, Jordan knew that his passion was in the arts and decided to go for his master's degree at the State University of Iowa in 1949. It was here that Jordan received his MFA.

Jordan went into the military from 1950 to 1952. During his years in the service, he did not cease to utilize his art training. He was commissioned to draw illustrations for training aids and eventually was made the art editor and chief cartoonist for the post newspaper at Fort Campbell, Kentucky.

Honorably discharged from the military in 1952, Dr. Jordan was asked to set up the art department at Allen University in Columbia, South Carolina. Later that year, he went back to Langston University as an art instructor and took the role as the chairman of the art department. In 1961, Dr. Jordan took on the position of chairman of the art department at Southern University, New Orleans. During these years, Jordan also painted a large mural located in the education building of SUNO. The mural was destroyed during Hurricane Katrina and the building was subsequently demolished.

== Honors and affiliations ==
During his career, Dr. Jordan's academic honors included an Alpha Phi Alpha National Scholarship in 1957, a Scholarship Award from Langston University, and the Indiana University Award.

Jordan was a founding member of the National Conference of Artists in 1959. According to Dr. Jordan, Chicago based artists Bernard Goss, Marion Perkins, Robert Jones, and Margaret Burroughs started the effort to congregate African American artists from all parts of the U.S. to discuss the concerns they shared. These African American artists were sent invitations to attend a conference on March 28 and 29, 1959, which ran at the same time as the 18th Annual Atlanta University Art Exhibition. This was the first official meeting of the NCA. Dr. Jordan was the chairman of the NCA from its inception until 1967, when he became the vice-chairman. The position of chairman was then given to Jimmy Lee Moseley of the Maryland State College in 1967, yet Jordan remained affiliated with the NCA as lead historian until his death.

== Collections and exhibitions ==
Four of his prints are available at the Metropolitan Museum of Art, gifted by Reba and Dave Williams in 1999. One of Jordan's most famous pieces, Going Home, an 11 7/8 x 9in. linocut from 1957, is in their collection. Jordan is also a part of the Clark Atlanta University Art Galleries' permanent collection. The exhibition, "Bitter/Sweet", which opened October 9, 2016 at CAU Art Museum, highlighted works from the 1940s to present on the theme of the African American experience. Jordan's Negro Girl Skipping Rope (1960) was on display.

== Selected works ==
Going Home (1957), Linocut, 11 7/8 x 9in.

Three Faces, Linocut, 7 × 8 1/4in.

Cousins, Linocut, 8 x 10 in.

Bourbon Street, New Orleans (1940s), Linocut, 10 × 7 7/8in.

Untitled Mural, Southern University, New Orleans, (destroyed)

Girl Skipping Rope (1960)
