= Jordan (given name) =

- Pronunciation: /ˈdʒɔːrdən/ JOR-dən
- Gender: Unisex (originally a male given name)
- Language: English

Origin
- Origin: Hebrew, through Greek
- Meaning: "Descend" or "flow down"
- Region of origin: Southern Levant

Other names
- Variant forms: Jorden, Jourdan, Jourden, Jordin, Jordyn, Jordon, Yarden, Yardyn, Yardeen

Jordan is a given name.

The form found in Western names originates from Hebrew: ירדן, romanized: Yarden, relating to the Jordan River in West Asia. According to the New Testament of the Bible, John the Baptist baptised Jesus Christ in the Jordan, and during the Crusades, crusaders and pilgrims would bring back some of the river water in containers to use in the baptism of their own children in Europe and Britain. It thus became popular as a first name. Jordanes, a 6th-century Gothic historian, may have popularised the name as well.

The Greek form is Ἰορδάνης (Iordanes), in Arabic it is Al-Urdunn, in Latin Jordanus, in Italian Giordano, in Spanish Jordán, in Portuguese Jordão, in German Jordan, in Dutch Jordaan, in French Jourdain, in Irish Iordáin or Riordan, in Russian Йордан (Yordan), in Romanian Iordan, in Bulgarian Йордан (Yordan), in Polish Jordan, and in Catalan Jordà.

The English form of the name appears to have died out after medieval times, but started to be used again the 19th century, becoming especially popular in the U.S. and some other countries in the latter half of the 20th century.

Jordan is used as either a given name or a surname. Until the late 1970s, "Jordan" was predominantly used as a male name in the United States, but later began to gain popularity as a female name as well. As of 2006, males accounted for 72.5% of people with this name in that country.

It may refer to:

== People ==
=== Pre-modern world ===
- Jordan of Ariano (died 1127), Norman count
- Jordan I of Capua (1045–1091), Italian noble
- Jordan II of Capua (1080–1127), Italian noble
- Jordan Catala (1280–1330), Dominican missionary and explorer
- Jordan Fantosme (died 1185), English poet and historian
- Jordan Foliot (1249–1298), English noble
- Jordan of Giano (1195–1262), Italian minorite
- Jordan of Hauteville (1060–1092), Italian noble
- Jordan of Laron (died 1051), English bishop
- Jordan IV of L'Isle-Jourdain (died 1288), French crusader
- Jordan Lupin (died 1197), Italian noble
- Jordan de Exeter (died 1258), Anglo-Norman knight
- Jordan Óge de Exeter (1269–1319), Anglo-Irish sheriff
- Jordan de l'Isla de Venessi, French troubador
- Jordan of Osnabrück (1220–1284), German political writer
- Jordan of Pisa (1255–1311), Italian monk and theologian
- Jordan of Quedlinburg (1300–1380), Augustinian writer
- Jordan of Santa Susanna (died 1154), French cardinal
- Jordan of Saxony (1190–1237), Dominican master general
- Saint Jordan (disambiguation), multiple people

=== A ===
- Jordan Abel, Canadian indigenous poet
- Jordan Abdull (born 1996), English rugby league footballer
- Jordan Aboki (born 1993), French basketball player
- Jordan Aboudou (born 1991), French basketball player
- Jordan Acker (born 1984), American lawyer
- Jordan Adams (disambiguation), multiple people
- Jordan Adebayo-Smith (born 2001), American soccer player
- Jordan Adéoti (born 1989), French footballer
- Jordan Adetunji (born 1999), Northern Irish rapper
- Jordan Addison (born 2002), American football player
- Jordan Akins (born 1992), American football player
- Jordan Alan (born 1967), American film director
- Jordan Alexander (born 1993), Canadian actress
- Jordan Alexandra (born 1993), English actress
- Jordan Allan (born 1998), Scottish footballer
- Jordan Allen (born 1995), American soccer player
- Jordan Allen-Dutton (born 1977), American writer
- Jordan Alonge (born 1999), English footballer
- Jordan Amavi (born 1994), French footballer
- Jordan Amissah (born 2001), German footballer
- Jordan Anagblah (1957–2014), Ghanaian football executive
- Jordan Anderson (1825–1905), American slave
- Jordan Anderson (racing driver) (born 1991), American stock car racing driver
- Jordan Andrews (born 1986), Welsh composer
- Jordan Angeli (born 1986), American soccer player
- Jordan Anthony (born 2004), American athlete
- Jordan Archer (born 1993), Scottish footballer
- Jordan Arnolin (born 2008), Portuguese footballer
- Jordan Ashman (born 2004), British percussionist
- Jordan Askill, Australian jeweler
- Jordan Atkins (born 1983), Australian rugby league footballer
- Jordan Augier (born 1994), Saint Lucian swimmer
- Jordan Ayew (born 1991), Ghanaian footballer
- Jordan Ayimbila (born 2001), Ghanaian footballer

=== B ===
- Jordan Babineaux (born 1982), American football player
- Jordan Bachynski (born 1989), Canadian basketball player
- Jordan Baggett (born 1996), American soccer player
- Jordan Bak (born 1994), Jamaican-American violinist
- Jordan Baker (disambiguation), multiple people
- Jordan Baker-Caldwell (born 1983), American artist
- Jordan Balazovic (born 1998), Canadian baseball player
- Jordan Baldwinson (born 1994), English rugby league footballer
- Jordan Ball (born 1993), English footballer
- Jordan Banjo (born 1992), British street dancer
- Jordan Banks (born 1968), Canadian businessman
- Jordan Bannister (born 1982), Australian rules footballer
- Jordan Bardella (born 1995), French politician
- Jordan Barnett (disambiguation), multiple people
- Jordan Barrera (born 2006), Colombian footballer
- Jordan Barrett (born 1996), Australian model
- Jordan Barroilhet (born 1998), French footballer
- Jordan Battle (born 2000), American football player
- Jordan Baylis (born 2005), Australian soccer player
- Jordan Beaulieu (born 1993), Canadian football player
- Jordan Beck (disambiguation), multiple people
- Jordan Belchos (born 1989), Canadian speed skater
- Jordan Belfi (born 1978), American actor
- Jordan Belfort (born 1962), American author
- Jordan Bell (born 1995), American basketball player
- Jordan Belson (1926–2011), American artist
- Jordan Bender (born 2001), American soccer player
- Jordan Bennett (born 1951), American singer-songwriter
- Jordan Bennett (artist) (born 1986), Canadian artist
- Jordan Bentley (born 1999), English footballer
- Jordan Bernstine (born 1989), American football player
- Jordan Berry (born 1991), Australian-American football player
- Jordan Beyer (born 2000), German footballer
- Jordan Binnington (born 1993), Canadian ice hockey player
- Jordan Bischel (born 1981), American baseball coach
- Jordan Black (disambiguation), multiple people
- Jordan Blilie (born 1981), American vocalist
- Jordan Blount (born 1997), Irish basketball player
- Jordan Blum (born 1982), American television writer
- Jordan Bly (born 2002), American football player
- Jordan Bohannon (born 1997), American basketball player
- Jordan Bolger (born 1994), English actor
- Jordan Bone (born 1997), American basketball player
- Jordan Bonel, French troubadour
- Jordan Boon (born 2000), New Zealand footballer
- Jordan Bos (born 2002), Australian footballer
- Jordan Botaka (born 1993), Congolese footballer
- Jordan Botelho (born 2001), American football player
- Jordan Bouah (born 1995), Italian American football player
- Jordan Bove (born 1995), English footballer
- Jordan Bowden (born 1997), American basketball player
- Jordan Bowers (born 2003), American artistic gymnast
- Jordan Bowery (born 1991), Kittitian footballer
- Jordan Boyd (born 1998), Australian rules footballer
- Jordan Boys (born 1997), Australian racing driver
- Jordan Brady (born 1964), American film director
- Jordan Brady (basketball) (born 1983), American basketball player
- Jordan Brailford (born 1995), American football player
- Jordan Brangers (born 1995), American basketball coach
- Jordan Brauninger (born 1987), American figure skater
- Jordan Brewer (born 1997), American baseball player
- Jordan Brewster (born 1999), American soccer player
- Jordan Brickner (born 1990), American ice hockey player
- Jordan Bridges (born 1973), American actor
- Jordan Bridges (politician) (born 1988), American politician
- Jordan Broisin (born 1993), French para-alpine skier
- Jordan Brook (born 1995), English television personality
- Jordan Brookes (born 1986), Scottish comedian
- Jordan Brower (born 1981), American actor
- Jordan Brown (disambiguation), multiple people
- Jordan Bruner (born 1997), American basketball player
- Jordan Brunoli (1995–2026), Australian musician
- Jordan Buckingham (born 2000), Australian cricketer
- Jordan Burch (born 2001), American football player
- Jordan Burns (born 1997), American basketball player
- Jordan Burroughs (born 1988), American wrestler
- Jordan Burrow (born 1992), English footballer
- Jordan Burt (born 1990), American soccer player
- Jordan Byrd (born 2000), American football player

=== C ===
- Jordan Cairnie (born 1996), Scottish footballer
- Jordan Callahan (born 1990), American basketball player
- Jordan Calloway (born 1990), American actor
- Jordan Cameron (born 1988), American football player
- Jordin Canada (born 1995), American basketball player
- Jordan Cane (born 2001), British racing driver
- Jordan Canning (born 1982), Canadian film director
- Jordan Cano (born 1996), American soccer player
- Jordan Cantwell (born 1967), Canadian priest
- Jordan Canzeri (born 1993), American football player
- Jordan Carlos (born 1978), American comedian
- Jordan Caroline (born 1996), American basketball player
- Jordan Caron (born 1990), Canadian ice hockey player
- Jordan Carrell (born 1994), American football player
- Jordán Carrillo (born 2001), Mexican footballer
- Jordan Carroll (born 2006), Canadian gymnast
- Jordan Carstens (born 1981), American football player
- Jordan Preston Carter (born 2008), American actor
- Jordan Carver (born 1986), German model and actress
- Jordan Case (born 1957), Canadian football player
- Jordan Casteel (born 1989), American painter
- Jordan Castell (born 2004), American football player
- Jordan Castro (born 1992/1993), American writer
- Jordan Catchpole (born 1999), British Paralympic swimmer
- Jordan Cekov (1921–2019), Macedonian activist
- Jordan Chait (born 1997), South African rugby union footballer
- Jordan Chambers (1896–1962), American politician
- Jordan Chatman (born 1993), American basketball player
- Jordan Chiedozie (born 1994), English footballer
- Jordan Chiles (born 2001), American gymnast
- Jordan Chipangama (born 1988), Zambian runner
- Jordan Cila (born 1982), American soccer player
- Jordan Chan (born 1967), Hong Kong actor
- Jordan Chan (footballer) (born 1998), Singaporean footballer
- Jordan Chanetsa (born 1997), Zimbabwean activist
- Jordan Chapell (born 1991), English footballer
- Jordan Chariton (born 1986), American reporter
- Jordan Charney (born 1937), American actor
- Jordan Chavez (born 1997), American soccer player
- Jordan Chort (born 1987), French footballer
- Jordan Christopher (1940–1996), American actor
- Jordan Chunn (born 1995), American football player
- Jordan Clark (disambiguation), multiple people
- Jordan Clarke (disambiguation), multiple people
- Jordan Clarkson (born 1992), American-Filipino basketball player
- Jordan Clearwater (born 1997), American professional wrestler
- Jordan Coelho (born 1992), French swimmer
- Jordan Coghlan (born 1992), Irish rugby union footballer
- Jordan Cohen (born 1997), American-Israeli basketball player
- Jordan Colbert (born 2000), American football player
- Jordan Collier (disambiguation), multiple people
- Jordan Connerton (born 1989), English footballer
- Jordan Connor (born 1991), Canadian actor
- Jordan Conroy (born 1994), Irish rugby union footballer
- Jordan Cook (born 1990), English footballer
- Jordan E. Cooper (born 1995), American playwright
- Jordan Corey (born 1990), American singer-songwriter
- Jordan Corvée (born 1995), French badminton player
- Jordan Cornfield (born 1982), Canadian lacrosse player
- Jordan Coulson (born 1993), British actor
- Jordan Coulter (born 1992), Australian model
- Jordan Courtney-Perkins (born 2002), Australian footballer
- Jordan Cousins (born 1994), Jamaican footballer
- Jordan Cowan (born 1990), American ice dancer
- Jordan Cox (disambiguation), multiple people
- Jordan Crane (disambiguation), multiple people
- Jordan Cranston (born 1993), English footballer
- Jordan E. Cravens (1830–1914), American lawyer and politician
- Jordan Crawford (born 1988), American basketball player
- Jordan Cronenweth (1935–1996), American cinematographer
- Jordan Crook (born 2003), American football player
- Jordan Crooks (born 2002), Caymanian swimmer
- Jordan Cropper (born 2000), English footballer
- Jordan Crowther (born 1997), English rugby league footballer
- Jordan Crugnale (born 1969), Australian politician
- Jordan Culbreath, American football player
- Jordan Cunico (born 1996), Australian rules footballer
- Jordan Cunningham (born 1977), American politician

=== D ===
- Jordan da Costa (1932–2012), Brazilian footballer
- Jordan Dalrymple, American musician
- Jordan Daly, Scottish activist
- Jordan Danberry (born 1997), American basketball player
- Jordan Dane (born 1953), American novelist
- Jordan Danger (born 1991), American actress
- Jordan Dangerfield (born 1990), American football player
- Jordan Marie Daniel (born 1988), American indigenous filmmaker
- Jordan Danks (born 1986), American baseball player
- Jordan Dasuqi (born 1994), Jordanian-American basketball player
- Jordan Davies (disambiguation), multiple people
- Jordan Davis (disambiguation), multiple people
- Jordan Dawson (born 1997), Australian rules footballer
- Jordan Daykin (born 1995), British businessman
- Jordan de Freitas (born 1966), Brazilian football manager
- Jordan De Goey (born 1996), Australian rules footballer
- Jordan De Jong (born 1979), American baseball player
- Jordan de Melburne, English archdeacon
- Jordan DeMercy (born 1988), American basketball player
- Jordan Derkack (born 2003), American basketball player
- Jordan Deschamps-Braly (born 1979), American surgeon
- Jordan Desilets (born 1980), American steeplechase runner
- Jordan DeSilva (born 1990), Bermudian cricketer
- Jordan Devey (1988–2026), American football player
- Jordan Dezaria (born 1996), French rugby league footballer
- Jordan Díaz (disambiguation), multiple people
- Jordan Dickerson (born 1993), American basketball player
- Jordan Dingle (born 2000), American basketball player
- Jordan Dodson (born 1987), New Zealand screenwriter
- Jordan Doering (born 1979), Australian rules footballer
- Jordan Doherty (born 2000), Irish footballer
- Jordan Domínguez (born 1995), Spanish footballer
- Jordan Doner, American photographer
- Jordan Donica (born 1994), American actor
- Jordan Dover (born 1994), Guyanese footballer
- Jordan Drew (born 1995), Australian rugby league footballer
- Jordan Duggan (born 1998), Irish rugby union footballer
- Jordan Dunstan (born 1993), Canadian soccer player
- Jordan Dupray (born 1991), French footballer
- Jordan Dwyer, American football player
- Jordan Dyer (born 2000), English footballer
- Jordan Dykstra (born 1985), American composer

=== E ===
- Jordan Eagers (born 1989), English footballer
- Jordan Winston Early (1814–1903), American preacher
- Jordan Eberle (born 1990), Canadian hockey player
- Jordan Edwards (footballer) (born 1999), English footballer
- Jordan Edwards-Wilks (born 1994), British singer-songwriter
- Jordan Ellenberg (born 1971), American mathematician
- Jordan Elliott (born 1997), American football player
- Jordan Els (born 1997), South African rugby union footballer
- Jordan Elsey (born 1994), Australian footballer
- Jordan Emanuel (born 1992), American model
- Jordan Emaviwe (born 2001), Singaporean footballer
- Jordan Espinosa (born 1989), American mixed martial artist
- Jordan Evans (disambiguation), multiple people
- Jordan Lutalo Evora (born 1979), Ugandan-Dutch kickboxer

=== F ===
- Jordan Faison (disambiguation), multiple people
- Jordan Faria (born 2000), Canadian soccer player
- Jordan Farmar (born 1986), American basketball player
- Jordan Farquharson (born 2000), Bahamian footballer
- Jordan Farr (born 1994), American soccer player
- Jordan Faucher (born 1991), French footballer
- Jordan Fauqué (born 1991), French footballer
- Jordan Fee (born 1989), American basketball coach
- Jordan Feliz (born 1989), American musician
- Jordan Ferrell (born 1987), American soccer player
- Jordan Ferri (born 1992), French footballer
- Jordan Firstman (born 1991), American producer and comedian
- Jordan Fish (born 1986), English record producer
- Jordan Fisher (born 1994), American actor and singer
- Jordan Fitzpatrick (born 1988), English footballer
- Jordan Fliegel (born 1986), American-Israeli entrepreneur
- Jordan Flores (born 1995), English footballer
- Jordan Floyd (born 1997), American basketball player
- Jordan Foisy, Canadian comedian
- Jordan Foley (born 1979), American filmmaker
- Jordan Foote (born 1996), Australian rules footballer
- Jordan Ford (born 1998), American basketball player
- Jordan Fowler (born 1984), English footballer
- Jordan Frampton (born 1985), English motorcycle racer
- Jordan Francis (born 1991), Canadian singer and dancer
- Jordan Franks (born 1996), American football player
- Jordan Fraser-Trumble (born 1986), American actor
- Jordan Fudge, American film producer
- Jordan Fuller (born 1998), American football player
- Jordan Fusco (born 2003), American soccer player

=== G ===
- Jordan Gafa (born 1990), American soccer player
- Jordan Luke Gage (born 1992), English actor
- Jordan Galland (born 1980), American filmmaker
- Jordan Gallucci (born 1998), Australian rules footballer
- Jordan Galtier (born 1989), French footballer
- Jordan Ganchovski (born 1953), Bulgarian writer
- Jordan García (born 2005), Colombian footballer
- Jordan Garcia-Calvete (born 1992), Belgian footballer
- Jordan Garrick (born 1998), Jamaican footballer
- Jordan Gavaris (born 1989), Canadian actor
- Jordan Gavet (born 1988), Australian-New Zealand singer
- Jordan Gay (born 1990), American football player
- Jordan Geist (born 1998), American shot putter
- Jordan Gelber (born 1975), American actor
- Jordan Gele (born 1992), French footballer
- Jordan Geller (born 1977), American shoe collector
- Jordán Bruno Genta (1909–1974), Argentinian philosopher
- Jordan Gershowitz, American television writer
- Jordan Gibbons (born 1993), English footballer
- Jordan Gibson (born 1998), English footballer
- Jordan Gill (born 1994), English boxer
- Jordan Gillis (born 1974), American politician
- Jordan Glasgow (born 1996), American football player
- Jordan Glatt, American politician
- Jordan Gobron (born 1992), French footballer
- Jordan Goddard (born 1993), English footballer
- Jordan Gogos (born 1994), American fashion designer
- Jordan Goldnadel (born 1989), French film director
- Jordan Goldwire (born 1999), American basketball player
- Jordan A. Goodman, American physicist
- Jordan Goodwin (born 1998), American basketball player
- Jordan B. Gorfinkel (born 1967), American comics writer
- Jordan Goudreau (born 1976), Canadian-American soldier
- Jordan Grafman (born 1950), American neuropsychologist
- Jordan Graham (born 1995), English footballer
- Jordan Graham (footballer, born 1997) (born 1997), English footballer
- Jordan Grant (disambiguation), multiple people
- Jordan Grantz (born 1992), American soccer player
- Jordan Gray (disambiguation), multiple people
- Jordan Graye (born 1987), American soccer player
- Jordan Green (born 1995), English footballer
- Jordan Greenidge (born 2000), English footballer
- Jordan Greenway (born 1997), American ice hockey player
- Jordan Gregory (born 1992), American basketball player
- Jordan Griffin (born 1990), American mixed martial artist
- Jordan Groshans (born 1999), American baseball player
- Jordan Gross (born 1980), American football player
- Jordan Gross (ice hockey) (born 1995), American ice hockey player
- Jordan Gruber (born 1983), American-Israeli soccer player
- Jordan Gruzen (1934–2015), American architect
- Jordan Guerrero (born 1994), Mexican-American baseball player
- Jordan Guitton (born 1995), French politician
- Jordan Guivin (born 1998), Peruvian footballer
- Jordan Gumberg (born 1995), American golfer
- Jordan Gusman (born 1994), Maltese runner
- Jordan Gutiérrez (born 1998), Spanish footballer
- Jordan Gysberts (born 1991), Australian rules footballer

=== H ===
- Jordan Hadaway (born 2002), Welsh football coach
- Jordan Hadfield (born 1987), English footballer
- Jordan Haj (born 1988), Czech musician
- Jordan Hall (disambiguation), multiple people
- Jordan Hallam (born 1998), English footballer
- Jordan Halsman (born 1991), Scottish footballer
- Jordan Hamilton (disambiguation), multiple people
- Jordan Hancock (born 2003), American football player
- Jordan Hand (born 1993), English rugby league footballer
- Jordan Harbinger (born 1980), American podcaster
- Jordan Harris (disambiguation), multiple people
- Jordan Harrison (disambiguation), multiple people
- Jordan Harrod (born 1996), American YouTuber and scientist
- Jordan Hart (born 1995), Welsh badminton player
- Jordan Hartney (born 1988), Canadian swimmer
- Jordan Harvey (born 1984), American soccer player
- Jordan Hasay (born 1991), American runner
- Jordan Hastings (born 1982), Canadian musician
- Jordan Hawkins (born 2002), American basketball player
- Jordan Hayes (born 1987), Canadian television actress
- Jordan Haynes (born 1996), Canadian soccer player
- Jordan Heading (born 1996), Filipino basketball player
- Jordan Genmark Heath (born 1997), Swedish American football player
- Jordan Heather (born 1990), Canadian American football player
- Jordan Helliwell (born 2001), English footballer
- Jordan Henderson (born 1990), English footballer
- Jordan Henderson (politician), American politician
- Jordan Hendry (born 1984), Canadian ice hockey player
- Jordan Henri (born 1993), Belgian footballer
- Jordan Hendrikse (born 2001), South African rugby union footballer
- Jordan Hendry (born 1984), Canadian ice hockey player
- Jordan Henriquez (born 1989), American basketball player
- Jordan Henry (born 1986), Canadian ice hockey player
- Jordan Herdman-Reed (born 1994), Canadian football player
- Jordan Hermann (born 2001), South African cricketer
- Jordan Hicks (disambiguation), multiple people
- Jordan Hill (disambiguation), multiple people
- Jordan Hobbs (born 2003), American basketball player
- Jordan Hoffman, American film critic
- Jordan Holland (born 1995), American football player
- Jordan Holloway (born 1996), American baseball player
- Jordan Holmes (born 1997), Australian footballer
- Jordan Holsgrove (born 1999), Scottish footballer
- Jordan Holt (disambiguation), multiple people
- Jordan Hooper (born 1992), American basketball player
- Jordan Hoover (born 1993), Canadian football player
- Jordan Horowitz (born 1980), American film producer
- Jordan Horston (born 2001), American basketball player
- Jordan Houghton (born 1995), English footballer
- Jordan Houlden (born 1998), English diver
- Jordan Houston (footballer) (born 2000), Scottish footballer
- Jordan Houtby (born 1991), American lacrosse player
- Jordan Howard (born 1994), American football player
- Jordan Howard (basketball) (born 1996), Puerto Rican basketball player
- Jordan Howe (born 1995), Welsh paralympic athlete
- Jordan Howden (born 2000), American football player
- Jordan Howlett (born 1998), American social media personality
- Jordan Hubbard (born 1963), American software developer
- Jordan Hudson (born 2003), American football player
- Jordan Hughes (born 1984), Canadian soccer player
- Jordan Hugill (born 1992), English footballer
- Jordan Hulls (born 1990), American basketball player
- Jordan Hulme (born 1990), English footballer
- Jordan Hunt (born 1997), New Zealand basketball player
- Jordan Hunter (disambiguation), multiple people
- Jordan Hutchings (born 2002), New Zealand rugby union footballer
- Jordan Hyland (born 1989), New Zealand rugby union footballer

=== I ===
- Jordan Ifueko (born 1993), Nigerian-American writer
- Jordan Ikoko (born 1994), French footballer
- Jordan Ivey (born 1992), Australian rules footballer
- Jordan Ivy-Curry (born 2002), American basketball player

=== J ===
- Jordan Jackson (disambiguation), multiple people
- Jordan Jackson-Hope (born 1996), Australian rugby union footballer
- Jordan Jacobo, American actor and screenwriter
- Jordan James (disambiguation), multiple people
- Jordan Jankowski (born 1989), American baseball player
- Jordan Jansen (born 1998), Australian singer
- Jordan Jarrett-Bryan (born 1983), English sports journalist
- Jordan Jarvis (born 1998), Filipino footballer
- Jordan Jefferson (born 1990), American football player
- Jordan Jefferson (defensive lineman) (born 2001), American football player
- Jordan Jegat (born 1999), French cyclist
- Jordan Jelev (born 1975), Bulgarian graphic artist
- Jordan Jenkins (born 1994), American football player
- Jordan Jenkins (speedway rider) (born 2001), English speedway rider
- Jordan Jenks (born 1993), Belizean-American rapper
- Jordan Johnson (disambiguation), multiple people
- Jordan Johnson-Hinds (born 1989), Canadian actor
- Jordan Johnstone (born 1997), English rugby league footballer
- Jordan Jones (disambiguation), multiple people
- Jordan Joseph (born 2000), French rugby union footballer
- Jordan Jovanovic (born 1992), Serbian footballer
- Jordan Ju (born 1995), Taiwanese figure skater
- Jordan Juron (born 1994), American ice hockey player

=== K ===
- Jordan Attah Kadiri (born 2000), Nigerian footballer
- Jordan Kahu (born 1991), New Zealand rugby league footballer
- Jordan Kamchev (born 1970), Macedonian businessman
- Jordan Kannianen (born 1983), American politician
- Jordan Karagavrilidis (born 1958), Czech ice hockey player
- Jordan Katembula (born 1978), Zambian singer-songwriter
- Jordan Katz, American musician
- Jordan Kawaguchi (born 1997), Canadian ice hockey player
- Jordan Kealy, Canadian politician
- Jordan Keegan (born 1992), Irish footballer
- Jordan Kensington (born 1981), British entrepreneur
- Jordan Kent (born 1984), American football player
- Jordan Kerby (born 1992), Australian-New Zealand cyclist
- Jordan Kerner (born 1950), American film producer
- Jordan Kerr (born 1979), Australian tennis player
- Jordan Kessler, American film producer
- Jordan Kilganon (born 1992), Canadian basketball player
- Jordan King (disambiguation), multiple people
- Jordan Kirkpatrick (born 1992), Scottish footballer
- Jordan Klassen, Canadian singer-songwriter
- Jordan Klepper (born 1979), American comedian
- Jordan Knackstedt (born 1988), Canadian ice hockey player
- Jordan Knight (disambiguation), multiple people
- Jordan Kos (born 2000), Canadian lawn bowler
- Jordan Kovacs (born 1990), American football player and coach
- Jordan Kramer (born 1979), American football player
- Jordan Kremyr (born 1986), Canadian ice hockey player
- Jordan Krestanovich (born 1981), Canadian ice hockey player
- Jordan Kunaszyk (born 1996), American football player
- Jordan Kurella, American author
- Jordan Kurland (born 1972), American businessman
- Jordan Kyle, American record producer
- Jordan Kyrou (born 1998), Canadian ice hockey player

=== L ===
- Jordan Labrosse (born 2002), French cyclist
- Jordan Ladd (born 1975), American actress
- Jordan Lam (born 1999), Hong Kong footballer
- Jordan Lane (disambiguation), multiple people
- Jordan Lang (1813–1893), American politician
- Jordan Langs (born 1989), American football coach
- Jordan Larmour (born 1997), Irish rugby union footballer
- Jordan Larson (born 1986), American volleyball player
- Jordan Larsson (born 1997), Swedish footballer
- Jordan Lasker, American internet personality and researcher
- Jordan Lasley (born 1996), American football player
- Jordan Lauton (born 2003), Australian soccer player
- Jordan Lawlar (born 2002), American baseball player
- Jordan Lawrence-Gabriel (born 1998), English footballer
- Jordan Laws, American record producer
- Jordan Lay (born 1992), Samoan rugby union footballer
- Jordan Leasure (born 1998), American baseball player
- Jordan Leavitt (born 1995), American mixed martial artist
- Jordan Leborgne (born 1995), Guadeloupean footballer
- Jordan Lee (disambiguation), multiple people
- Jordan Lefort (born 1993), Mauritanian footballer
- Jordan Leggett (born 1995), American football player
- Jordan Lenac (born 1997), Australian rugby union footballer
- Jordan Lennerton (born 1986), Canadian baseball player
- Jordan Leondopoulos, American film editor
- Jordan Leopold (born 1980), American ice hockey player
- Jordan Leslie (born 1991), American football player
- Jordan Levasseur (born 1995), French cyclist
- Jordan Levin (born 1967), American media executive
- Jordan Levine (born 1986), American lacrosse player
- Jordan Yale Levine (born 1985), American film producer
- Jordan Levy (1943–2023), American politician
- Jordan Lewis (born 1986), Australian rules footballer
- Jordan Lilley (born 1996), English rugby league footballer
- Jordan Linden (born 1995/1996), Scottish politician
- Jordan Lisle (born 1990), Australian rules footballer
- Jordan Litz (born 1988), American actor
- Jordan Lloyd (born 1986), American reality television participant
- Jordan Wayne Long (born 1982), American filmmaker
- Jordan Longino (born 2002), American basketball player
- Jordan Lopez (born 1998), American politician
- Jordan Lotiès (born 1984), French footballer
- Jordan Lotomba (born 1998), Swiss footballer
- Jordan Love (born 1998), American football player
- Jordan Love (racing driver) (born 1999), Australian racing driver
- Jordan Loveridge (born 1993), American basketball player
- Jordan Lowe (born 1991), English cricketer
- Jordan Loyd (born 1993), American basketball player
- Jordan Lucas (born 1993), American football player
- Jordan Lucas (volleyball) (born 2004), American volleyball player
- Jordan Luce (born 1993), West Indian wheelchair basketball player
- Jordan Luck (born 1961), New Zealand singer
- Jordan Lukaku (born 1994), Belgian footballer
- Jordan Luke (born 1993/1994), Australian rugby union footballer
- Jordan Lund (born 1957), American actor
- Jordan Luplow (born 1993), American baseball player
- Jordan Lussey (born 1994), English footballer
- Jordan Lyden (born 1996), Australian footballer
- Jordan Lyles (born 1990), American baseball player
- Jordan Lynch (born 1990), American football player

=== M ===
- Jordan Mabin (born 1988), American football player
- Jordan Macey (born 1983), Australian rugby union footballer
- Jordan Machado (born 1995), French footballer
- Jordan Mackampa (born 1994), British-Congolese musician
- Jordan Magee (born 2001), American football player
- Jordan Mageo (born 1997), American sprinter
- Jordan Magnuson (born 1984), American video game designer
- Jordan Maguire-Drew (born 1997), English footballer
- Jordan Mailata (born 1997), Samoan-Australian American football player
- Jordan Majchrzak (born 2004), Polish footballer
- Jordan Maksymic (born 1987), Canadian football coach
- Jordan Målare, Swedish artist
- Jordan Maletta (born 1995), Canadian ice hockey player
- Jordan Malinovski (1923–1996), Bulgarian scientist
- Jordan Malloch (born 1978), American sprint canoeist
- Jordan Malone (born 1984), American speed skater
- Jordan Mancino (born 1983), American musician
- Jordan Mang-osan (born 1967), Filipino artist
- Jordan Manihera (born 1993), New Zealand rugby union footballer
- Jordan Marié (born 1991), French footballer
- Jordan Maron (born 1992), American musician
- Jordan Marshall (disambiguation), multiple people
- Jordan Martel (born 1996), English cricketer
- Jordan Martin (born 2000), Australian rugby league footballer
- Jordan Martinook (born 1992), Canadian ice hockey player
- Jordan Mason (born 1999), American football player
- Jordan Massengo (born 1990), French footballer
- Jordan Masterson (born 1986), American actor
- Jordan Matechuk (born 1985), Canadian football player
- Jordan Mathews (born 1994), American basketball player
- Jordan Matson (born 1986), American soldier
- Jordan Matter (born 1996), American photographer and YouTuber
- Jordan Mattern (born 1993), American swimmer
- Jordan Matthews (disambiguation), multiple people
- Jordan Matyas (born 1993), American rugby union footballer
- Jordan Maynor, American politician
- Jordan McCabe (born 1998), American basketball player
- Jordan McCloskey (born 1979), Canadian actor
- Jordan McCloud (born 1999), American football player
- Jordan McCrary (born 1993), American soccer player
- Jordan McCray (born 1992), American football player
- Jordan McCreadie (born 1989), American racing driver
- Jordan McFadden (born 1999), American football player
- Jordan McFarlane-Archer (born 1993), English footballer
- Jordan McGhee (born 1996), Scottish footballer
- Jordan McGregor (born 1997), Scottish footballer
- Jordan McIntosh (born 1995), Canadian singer-songwriter
- Jordan McLaughlin (born 1996), American basketball player
- Jordan McLean (born 1991), Australian rugby league footballer
- Jordan McLean (musician) (born 1974), American musician
- Jordan McMahon (born 1983), Australian rules footballer
- Jordan McMillan (born 1988), Scottish footballer
- Jordan McNair (1999–2018), American football player
- Jordan McPhail, Canadian politician
- Jordan McRae (born 1991), American basketball player
- Jordan Meads (born 1992), Greek rugby league footballer
- Jordan Mechner (born 1964), American video game designer
- Jordan Mein (born 1989), Canadian mixed martial artist
- Jordan Membrey (born 1996), Australian rules footballer
- Jordan Mendes (born 2004), French footballer
- Jordan Meredith (born 1998), American football player
- Jordan Metcalfe (born 1986), English actor
- Jordan Michaels, American entrepreneur
- Jordan Michallet (1993–2022), French rugby union footballer
- Jordan Mickey (born 1994), American basketball player
- Jordan Milbrath (born 1991), American baseball player
- Jordan Miller (disambiguation), multiple people
- Jordan Millot (born 1990), French footballer
- Jordan Mills (born 1990), American football player
- Jordan Michael (born 2009), American soccer player
- Jordan Mims (born 1999), American football player
- Jordan Mincy (born 1986), American basketball coach
- Jordan Minor (born 2000), American basketball player
- Jordan Mintah (born 1995), Ghanaian footballer
- Jordan Mintz (born 1956), American businessman
- Jordan Missig (born 1998), American racing driver
- Jordan Moeller (born 1995), American figure skater
- Jordan Mohilowski (born 1984), American musician
- Jordan Molloy (born 1999), Irish hurler
- Jordan Monaghan, British criminal
- Jordan Montgomery (born 1992), American baseball player
- Jordan Moore (born 1994), Scottish footballer
- Jordan Moore (American football) (born 2002), American football player
- Jordan Moore-Taylor (born 1994), English footballer
- Jordan Morgan (disambiguation), multiple people
- Jordan Morris (disambiguation), multiple people
- Jordan Morton (born 1992), Scottish footballer
- Jordan L. Mott (1799–1866), American entrepreneur
- Jordan Msumba, Malawian religious figure
- Jordan Mudge (born 1989), American football player
- Jordan Murdoch (born 1992), Australian rules footballer
- Jordan Murphy (disambiguation), multiple people
- Jordan Murrell (born 1993), Canadian soccer player
- Jordan Murray (disambiguation), multiple people
- Jordan Mustoe (born 1991), English footballer

=== N ===
- Jordan Nagai (born 2000), American actor
- Jordan Nassar (born 1985), American visual artist
- Jordan Neal (born 1985), American football coach
- Jordan Neill (born 2005), South African-Irish cricketer
- Jordan Neuman (born 1983), American football coach
- Jordan Ngatai (born 1993), New Zealand basketball player
- Jordan Nicholson (born 1993), English footballer
- Jordan Niebrugge (born 1993), American golfer
- Jordan Nikolić (1933–2018), Serbian singer
- Jordan Nkololo (born 1992), French-Congolese footballer
- Jordan Nobbs (born 1992), English footballer
- Jordan Bankston Noble (1800–1890), American soldier
- Jordan Nobles (born 1969), Canadian composer
- Jordan Nolan (born 1989), Canadian ice hockey player
- Jordan Noone (born 1992), American aerospace engineer
- Jordan Norberto (born 1986), Dominican baseball player
- Jordan Norley (born 1979), American politician
- Jordan North (born 1990), English disc jockey
- Jordan Northcott (born 2002), Scottish footballer
- Jordan Norville-Williams (born 2000), English footballer
- Jordan Norwood (born 1986), American football player
- Jordan Nguyen, Australian biomedical engineer
- Jordan Nwora (born 1998), Nigerian-American basketball player
- Jordan Nytes (born 2004), American soccer player

=== O ===
- Jordan Obita (born 1993), English footballer
- Jordan O'Brien (born 1992), American soccer player
- Jordan O'Connor (born 1972), Canadian musician
- Jordan O'Doherty (born 1997), Australian footballer
- Jordan Oesterle (born 1992), American ice hockey player
- Jordan Officer (born 1976), Canadian musician
- Jordan Oladokun (born 2002), American football player
- Jordan Olivar (1915–1990), American football coach
- Jordan Oliver (disambiguation), multiple people
- Jordan Olowofela (born 1998), English rugby union footballer
- Jordan Olsen (born 1990), New Zealand-Canadian rugby union footballer
- Jordan Onojaife (born 1995), English rugby union footballer
- Jordan Opoku (born 1983), Ghanaian footballer
- Jordan Oram, Canadian cinematographer
- Jordan S. Orange, American immunologist
- Jordan Nikolov Orce (1916–1944), North Macedonian activist
- Jordan Ott (born 1985), American basketball coach
- Jordan Owens (disambiguation), multiple people

=== P ===
- Jordan Pace (born 1989), American politician
- Jordan Pacheco (born 1986), American baseball player
- Jordan Page (born 1979), American singer-songwriter
- Jordan Page (rugby union) (born 1987), English rugby union footballer
- Jordan Palmer (born 1984), American football player
- Jordan Palmer-Samuels (born 1994), English footballer
- Jordan Pang (born 1998), Hong Kong politician
- Jordan Paopao (born 1986), American football coach
- Jordan Parkes (born 1989), English footballer
- Jordan Parks (born 1994), American basketball player
- Jordan Parra (born 1994), Colombian cyclist
- Jordan Parry (born 1995), New Zealand rower
- Jordan Parsons (1990–2016), American mixed martial artist
- Jordan Patrick (born 1992), English footballer
- Jordan Patterson (born 1992), American baseball player
- Jordan Payne (born 1993), New Zealand rugby union footballer
- Jordan Payton (born 1993), American football player
- Jordan Pearce (born 1986), American ice hockey player
- Jordan Peccia, American engineer and academic
- Jordan Peele (born 1979), American actor and director
- Jordan Pefok (born 1996), American soccer player
- Jordan Pepper (born 1996), South African racing driver
- Jordan Pereira (disambiguation), multiple people
- Jordan Perez (born 1986), Gibraltarian volleyball player
- Jordan Perruzza (born 2001), Canadian soccer player
- Jordan Perryman (born 1999), American football player
- Jordan Petaia (born 2000), Australian rugby union footballer
- Jordan Peters (disambiguation), multiple people
- Jordan Peterson (born 1962), Canadian psychologist
- Jordan Peterson (American football) (born 1987), American football coach
- Jordan Petrov (born 1994), Bulgarian footballer
- Jordan Phillips (born 1992), American football player
- Jordan Phillips (American football, born 2004) (born 2004), American football player
- Jordan Pickford (born 1994), English footballer
- Jordan Pierre, American sprinter
- Jordan Pierre-Charles (born 1993), French footballer
- Jordan Pierre-Gilles (born 1998), Canadian speed skater
- Jordan Piggott (born 1999), English footballer
- Jordan Pinder (born 1984), Canadian curler
- Jordan Plevnes (born 1953), Macedonian writer
- Jordan Pollack, American professor
- Jordan Ponticelli (born 1998), English footballer
- Jordan Poole (born 1999), American basketball player
- Jordan Pope (born 2003), American basketball player
- Jordan Pothain (born 1994), French swimmer
- Jordan Powell, American music producer
- Jordan Poyer (born 1991), American football player
- Jordan Pratt (born 1987), American judge
- Jordan Prentice (born 1973), Canadian actor
- Jordan Lane Price (born 1989), American actress
- Jordan Pruitt (born 1991), American singer
- Jordan Pugh (born 1988), American football player
- Jordan Pundik (born 1979), American singer

=== Q ===
- Jordan Quiggin (born 2005), Australian cricketer

=== R ===
- Jordan Radev (born 1976), Bulgarian wrestler
- Jordan Raf, American musician
- Jordan Rager (born 1994), American singer
- Jordan Railey (born 1992), American basketball player
- Jordan Rakei (born 1992), New Zealand-Australian musician
- Jordan Ramos (born 1995), British sprinter
- Jordan Raney (born 1996), American water polo player
- Jordan Rankin (born 1991), Australian rugby league footballer
- Jordan Rapana (born 1989), New Zealand rugby league footballer
- Jordan Rapp (born 1980), American triathlete
- Jordan Raskopoulos (born 1982), Australian comedian
- Jordan Rasmusson (born 1993), American politician
- Jordan Ray (born 2004), American ice hockey player
- Jordan Raycroft (born 1991), Canadian singer-songwriter
- Jordan Reaves (born 1990), Canadian football player
- Jordan Redman (born 1985), American politician
- Jordan Reed (born 1990), American football player
- Jordan Remacle (born 1987), Belgian footballer
- Jordan Rempel (born 1985), Canadian football player
- Jordan Renson (born 1996), Belgian footballer
- Jordan Renzo (born 1993), American actor
- Jordan James Reyes (born 1986), American musician
- Jordan Reyne (born 1974), New Zealand musician
- Jordan Rezabala (born 2000), Ecuadorian footballer
- Jordan Rhodes (born 1990), English footballer
- Jordan Riak (1935–2016), American teacher and activist
- Jordan Riber, Tanzanian filmmaker
- Jordan Rich (born 1958), American radio host
- Jordan Richard (born 1989), American basketball player
- Jordan Richard (bowler) (born 1995), American bowler
- Jordan Richards (disambiguation), multiple people
- Jordan Rideout (born 1993), English footballer
- Jordan Ridley (born 1998), Australian rules footballer
- Jordan Ridley (politician) (born 1992), American politician
- Jordan Riki (born 2000), New Zealand rugby league footballer
- Jordan Rinaldi (born 1987), American mixed martial artist
- Jordan Ritter (born 1978), American entrepreneur
- Jordan River (director) (born 1976), Italian film director
- Jordan Claire Robbins (born 1990), Bermudian-Canadian actress
- Jordan Roberts (disambiguation), multiple people
- Jordan Robertson (born 1988), English footballer
- Jordan Robinson (born 1991), English footballer
- Jordan Robson-Cramer, Canadian musician
- Jordán Rodas (born 1968), Guatemalan attorney and politician
- Jordan Rodgers (born 1988), American football player
- Jordan Rodrigues (born 1992), Australian actor
- Jordan Rodrigues (footballer) (born 1998), Brazilian footballer
- Jordan Roland (born 1997), American basketball player
- Jordan Romano (born 1993), Canadian baseball player
- Jordan Romero (born 1996), American mountaineer
- Jordan Daphne Rondel (born 1989), New Zealand-American entrepreneur
- Jordan Roos (born 1993), American football player
- Jordan Rose (born 1989), English footballer
- Jordan Rosenberg, American television producer
- Jordan Ross (disambiguation), multiple people
- Jordan Rossiter (born 1997), English footballer
- Jordan Roth (born 1975), American creative director
- Jordan Roughead (born 1990), Australian rules footballer
- Jordan Routledge, British actor
- Jordan Rubin (born 1972), American film director
- Jordan Rudess (born 1956), American keyboardist
- Jordan Russell (born 1986), Australian rules footballer
- Jordan Russolillo (born 1984), American soccer player
- Jordan Ryan (born 1950), American civil servant

=== S ===
- Jordan Sakho (born 1997), Congolese basketball player
- Jordan Saling (born 1996), American soccer player
- Jordan Samrani (born 2002), Australian rugby league footballer
- Jordan Samuel, Canadian make-up artist
- Jordan Samuels, American actor
- Jordan Samuels-Thomas (born 1990), American ice hockey player
- Jordan Sand (born 1960), American academic
- Jordan Sanderson (born 1993), English footballer
- Jordan Sandhu (born 1994), Indian actor
- Jordan Sandke (born 1946), American musician
- Jordan Sangha (born 1998), English footballer
- Jordan Santiago (born 1991), Canadian soccer coach
- Jordan Santos (born 1991), Portuguese beach soccer player
- Jordan Sarrou (born 1992), French mountain biker
- Jordan Scarlett (disambiguation), multiple people
- Jordan Schafer (born 1986), American baseball player
- Jordan Schakel (born 1998), American basketball player
- Jordan Schlansky (born 1973), American television producer
- Jordan Schmaltz (born 1993), American ice hockey player
- Jordan Schmidt (born 1988), American sound engineer
- Jordan Schnitzer (born 1951), American businessman
- Jordan Schroder (born 1992), Australian rules footballer
- Jordan Schroeder (born 1990), American ice hockey player
- Jordan Schur (born 1965), American entrepreneur
- Jordan Schwartz (born 1965), American economist
- Jordan Schweitzer (born 1994), Canadian soccer player
- Jordan Scott (disambiguation), multiple people
- Jordan Seabright (born 1994), English footballer
- Jordan Seabrook (born 1987), American soccer player
- Jordan Sears (born 2001), American basketball player
- Jordan Seaton (born 2004), American football player
- Jordan Sebban (born 1997), French footballer
- Jordan Sekulow (born 1982), American lawyer and political consultant
- Jordan Seiler (born 1979), American artist
- Jordan Selwyn (born 1989), New Zealand actor
- Jordan Semedo (born 2003), Bulgarian footballer
- Jordan Senn (born 1984), American football player
- Jordan Sepho (born 1998), French rugby union footballer
- Jordan Shapiro (born 1977), American author
- Jordan Sheed (born 1982), New Zealand cricketer
- Jordan Sheffield (born 1995), American baseball player
- Jordan Shimmell (born 1988), American boxer
- Jordan Shipley (born 1985), American football player
- Jordan Shipley (footballer) (born 1997), English footballer
- Jordan Shipp, American football player
- Jordan Shlain, American physician
- Jordan Sibert (born 1992), American basketball player
- Jordan Sierra (born 1997), Ecuadorian footballer
- Jordan Sigalet (born 1981), Canadian ice hockey player and coach
- Jordan Sigismeau (born 1992), French rugby league footballer
- Jordan Silk (born 1992), Australian cricketer
- Jordan Silkowitz (born 2000), American soccer player
- Jordan Silva (born 1994), Mexican footballer
- Jordan Simmons (born 1994), American football player
- Jordan Simpson (disambiguation), multiple people
- Jordan Sinclair (born 1996), Scottish footballer
- Jordan Sinnott (1994–2020), English footballer
- Jordan Sisco (born 1988), Canadian football player
- Jordan Skelton (born 1997), English footballer
- Jordan Slew (born 1992), British footballer
- Jordan Sloan (born 1993), Irish swimmer
- Jordan Smelker (born 1992), American ice hockey player
- Jordan Smiler (born 1985), New Zealand rugby union footballer
- Jordan Smith (disambiguation), multiple people
- Jordan Smoller (born 1961), American geneticist
- Jordan Smotherman (born 1986), American ice hockey player
- Jordan Smylie (born 2000), Australian footballer
- Jordan Howard Sobel (1929–2010), Canadian-American philosopher
- Jordan Somerville (born 1996), American football coach
- Jordan Sonnenblick (born 1969), American writer
- Jordin Sparks (born 1989), American singer
- Jordan Spence (born 1990), English footballer
- Jordan Spence (ice hockey) (born 2001), Japanese-Canadian ice hockey player
- Jordan Spieth (born 1993), American golfer
- Jordan Staal (born 1988), Canadian hockey player
- Jordan Stagmiller (born 1992), American soccer player
- Jordan St. Cyr, Canadian singer
- Jordan Steckler (born 1996), American football player
- Jordan Steen (born 1991), Canadian wrestler
- Jordan Alexander Stein (born 1978), American literary critic
- Jordan Stempleman (born 1977), American poet
- Jordan Stephens (born 1992), English musician
- Jordan Stephens (baseball) (born 1992), American baseball player
- Jordan Stevens (born 2000), English footballer
- Jordan Stevens (American football) (born 1987), American football coach
- Jordan Stewart (disambiguation), multiple people
- Jordan Stolz (born 2004), American speed skater
- Jordan Stone (born 1984), American soccer player
- Jordan Storey (born 1997), English footballer
- Jordan Stout (born 1998), American football player
- Jordan Strafer (born 1990), American filmmaker
- Jordan Stratford, Canadian author
- Jordan Sturdy (born 1962/1963), Canadian politician
- Jordan Subban (born 1995), Canadian ice hockey player
- Jordan Sunshine (born 2019), American child actor
- Jordan Suckley (born 1985), British disc jockey
- Jordan Sussex (born 1994), New Zealand cricketer
- Jordan Swibel (born 1999), Australian soccer player
- Jordan Swing (born 1990), American basketball player
- Jordan Szoke (born 1978), Canadian cyclist
- Jordan Szwarz (born 1991), Canadian ice hockey player

=== T ===
- Jordan Ta'amu (born 1997), American football player
- Jordan Tabor (1990–2014), English footballer
- Jordan Tai (born 1982), New Zealand boxer
- Jordan Tannahill (born 1998), Canadian writer
- Jordan Tansey (born 1986), English rugby league footballer
- Jordan Tata (born 1981), American baseball player
- Jordan Taufua (born 1992), New Zealand rugby union footballer
- Jordan Taylor (disambiguation), multiple people
- Jordan Tell (born 1997), Guadeloupean footballer
- Jordan Terrasse (born 2000), French runner
- Jordan Terrell (born 2000), American football player
- Jordan Teuscher (born 1984), American politician
- Jordan Teze (born 1999), Dutch footballer
- Jordan Theodore (born 1989), American basketball player
- Jordan Thomas (disambiguation), multiple people
- Jordan Thompson (disambiguation), multiple people
- Jordan Thorniley (born 1996), English footballer
- Jordan Tice (born 1987), American guitarist
- Jordan Tiegs (born 1987), Canadian baseball player
- Jordan Tillson (born 1993), English footballer
- Jordan Todman (born 1990), American football player
- Jordan Todorov (born 1980), Bulgarian filmmaker
- Jordan Todosey (born 1995), Canadian actress
- Jordin Tootoo (born 1983), Canadian ice hockey player
- Jordan Topoleski, American business executive
- Jordan Torunarigha (born 1997), German-Nigerian footballer
- Jordan Trainor (born 1996), New Zealand rugby union footballer
- Jordan Travis (born 2000), American football player
- Jordan Traylor (born 1993), American football coach
- Jordan Tresson (born 1988), French racing driver
- Jordan Tripp (born 1991), American football player
- Jordan Trovillion (born 1986), American actress
- Jordan Tucker (born 1998), American basketball player
- Jordan Tunnicliffe (born 1993), English footballer
- Jordan Turnbull (born 1994), English footballer
- Jordan Turner (born 1989), English rugby league footballer
- Jordan Turner (American football) (born 2001), American football player
- Jordan Turner (long jumper) (born 2002), Jamaican long jumper
- Jordan Turner-Hall (born 1988), English rugby union player
- Jordan Turpin (born 2000), American social media personality

=== U ===
- Jordan Uelese (born 1997), Australian rugby union footballer
- Jordan Ulery (born 1949), American politician
- Jordan Usher (born 1998), American basketball player
- Jordan Uta (born 2006), New Zealand rugby union footballer

=== V ===
- Jordán Vallmajo (1894–1983), Spanish wrestler
- Jordan Vandenberg (born 1990), Australian basketball player
- Jordan van den Berg (born 2002), South African American football player
- Jordan van den Lamb (born 1995), South African-Australian activist
- Jordan van der Gaag (born 1999), Dutch footballer
- Jordan Vandermade (born 1987), New Zealand television presenter
- Jordan Varnadore (born 1987), American politician
- Jordan Veasy (born 1995), American football player
- Jordan Verdone (born 1989), Canadian American football player
- Jordan Veretout (born 1993), French footballer
- Jordan Vestering (born 2000), Singaporean footballer
- Jordan Viars (born 2003), American baseball player
- Jordan Vogt-Roberts (born 1984), American filmmaker

=== W ===
- Jordan Walker (disambiguation), multiple people
- Jordan Walker-Pearlman (born 1967), American film director
- Jordan Walden (born 1987), American baseball player
- Jordan Wall (born 1985), American television actor
- Jordan Wall (actor, born 1981), American actor
- Jordan Waller (born 1992), British actor
- Jordan Walne (born 1992), English rugby league footballer
- Jordan Walsh (born 2004), American basketball player
- Jordan Ward (born 1995), American singer-songwriter
- Jordan Waring (born 1964), American musician
- Jordan Waters (born 2000), American football player
- Jordan Watkins (born 2002), American football player
- Jordan Watson (born 1987), English kickboxer
- Jordan Way (born 1994/1995), Australian rugby union referee
- Jordan Weal (born 1992), Canadian ice hockey player
- Jordan Webb (born 1988), Canadian soccer player
- Jordan Wedderburn (born 2002), South African water polo player
- Jordan Weems (born 1992), American baseball player
- Jordan Weidner, American basketball player
- Jordan Weisman (born 1960), American video game designer
- Jordan Weiss (born 1993), American writer
- Jordan C. Wells (1861–1946), American football player and coach
- Jordan Westburg (born 1999), American baseball player
- Jordan Westerkamp (born 1994), American football player
- Jordan Wheeler (born 1964), Canadian indigenous writer
- Jordan White (disambiguation), multiple people
- Jordan Whitehead (born 1997), American football player
- Jordan Whittington (born 2000), American football player
- Jordan Wicks (born 1999), American baseball player
- Jordyn Wieber (born 1995), American gymnast
- Jordan Wilimovsky (born 1994), American swimmer
- Jordan Wilkie (born 1982), Canadian politician
- Jordan Wilkins (born 1994), American football player
- Jordan Williams (disambiguation), multiple people
- Jordan Williams-Lambert (born 1994), American football player
- Jordan Williamsz (born 1992), Australian runner
- Jordan Willis (disambiguation), multiple people
- Jordan Wilson (born 1991), Canadian soccer player
- Jordan Wilson-Ross (born 1989), Canadian rugby union footballer
- Jordan Windle (born 1998), American diver
- Jordan Wolfson (born 1980), American visual artist
- Jordan Wood (born 1994), Australian canoeist
- Jordan Woodard (born 1995), American basketball player
- Jordan Woods-Robinson (born 1985), American actor
- Jordan Woolery, American softball player
- Jordan Woolley, American actor
- Jordan Wright (disambiguation), multiple people
- Jordan Wylie (born 1983), British television personality
- Jordan Wynn (born 1990), American football coach and player
- Jordan Wynter (born 1993), English footballer

=== Y ===
- Jordan Yamamoto (born 1996), American baseball player
- Jordan Young (disambiguation), multiple people
- Jordan Youngberg (born 1990/1991), American politician
- Jordan Younger (born 1978), American football coach
- Jordan Yost (born 2006), American baseball player

=== Z ===
- Jordan Zade (born 2003), American soccer player
- Jordan Zamora, Australian motorcycle racer
- Jordan Zamorano (born 2001), Indonesian footballer
- Jordan Zanchetta (born 1995), Australian rules footballer
- Jordan Zemura (born 1999), English-Zimbabwean footballer
- Jordan Zevon (born 1969), American musician
- Jordan Zietz (born 2001), American entrepreneur
- Jordan Zimmerman (born 1975), Canadian baseball player
- Jordan Zimmerman (advertising) (born 1956), American advertising executive
- Jordan Zimmermann (born 1986), American baseball player
- Jordan Zumwalt (born 1991), American football player
- Jordan Zunic (born 1991), Australian golfer

== Fictional characters ==
- Jordan Baker, a character in The Great Gatsby
- Hal Jordan, a Green Lantern character in DC Comics
- Jordan Kent, one of Superman's sons in the series Superman & Lois
- Jordan Li, a character in the television series The Boys
- Jordan Ridgeway, a character in the soap opera Days of Our Lives

== See also ==
- Jordan (surname), people with the surname Jordan
- General Jordan (disambiguation)
- Judge Jordan (disambiguation)
- Senator Jordan (disambiguation)
