= Longinos =

Longinos is the name of:

- José Longinos Ellauri (1789–1867), Uruguayan politician
- José Longinos Martínez (1756–1802), Spanish naturalist
- Longinos Navás (1858–1938), Spanish entomologist

== See also ==
- Longino, surname
