= Jordan White =

Jordan White may refer to:

- Jordan White (American football) (born 1988), American football wide receiver
- Jordan White (footballer) (born 1992), Scottish footballer
- Jordan White (musician) (born 1984), American rock musician
- Jordan White (ice hockey) (born 1988), Canadian ice hockey goaltender
