= Jordão =

Jordão is the Portuguese equivalent to Jordan.

Jordão or Jordao may refer to:

== People ==
- Aida Jordão, Portuguese-Canadian playwright
- Bernardino Jordão (1868-1940), Portuguese businessman
- Bruno Jordão (born 1998), Portuguese footballer
- Francisco Jordão (born 1979), Portuguese basketball player
- Manuel Jordão (1921–?), Portuguese footballer
- Polidoro Jordão, Viscount of Santa Teresa (1802–1879), Brazilian lieutenant-general and politician who served as Minister of War
- Rui Jordão (1952–2019), Angolan-born Portuguese international footballer
- Jordão Cardoso (born 1996), Portuguese footballer
- Jordão Diogo (born 1985), Portuguese footballer
- Jordao Pattinama (born 1989), Dutch footballer
- Jordão (footballer born 1971), Angolan-Portuguese footballer Adelino José Martins Batista

== Places ==
- Jordão, Acre, Brazil, a municipality
- Jordão River (Acre), Brazil
- Jordão River (Paraná), Brazil

== Other uses ==
- Jordão Theatre, Guimarães, Portugal
