= Longino =

Longino is an Italian surname. Notable people with the surname include:

- Andrew H. Longino (1854–1942), Governor of Mississippi
- Andrew Longino (freestyle skier) (born 2002), Canadian freestyle skier
- Helen Longino (born 1944), American philosopher
- Jordan Longino (born 2002), American basketballer

== See also ==
- Longino Welch (1900–1969), American track and field athlete
- Dr. H.A. Longino House, historic building in Arkansas
- Longinos, name
