= James Jordan =

James, Jim or Jimmy Jordan may refer to:

== Sports ==
- James Jordan (cricketer) (1793–1866), English first-class cricketer
- Jimmy Jordan (baseball) (1908–1957), American Major League Baseball player
- Jim Jordan (basketball) (1925–1999), American basketball player
- James Jordan (American football) (born 1978), American football player
- Jimmy Jordan (running back) (1944–2020), American football player
- Jim Jordan (boxer) (1936–2004), boxer from Northern Ireland

== Arts ==
- Jim Jordan (actor) (1896–1988), American radio comedy performer
- James Jordan (conductor) (born 1953), American musician, writer and educator
- James Jordan (dancer) (born 1978), English professional ballroom dancer
- James Jordan (actor) (born 1979), American television performer
- Jim Jordan (photographer), American fashion and commercial photographer

== Politics ==
- James Jordan (Indiana judge) (1842–1912), Indiana Supreme Court Justice
- Jim Jordan (Canadian politician) (1928–2012), Canadian Member of Parliament
- Jim Jordan (political consultant) (born 1961), American Democratic strategist
- Jim Jordan (born 1964), U.S. representative for Ohio's 4th congressional district since 2007

== Others ==
- James Jordan (publicist) (1930–2004), American publicist and advertising copywriter
- James R. Jordan Sr. (1936–1993), American murder victim and father of basketball star Michael Jordan
- James B. Jordan (born 1949), American Calvinist theologian and author
- Jim Jordan (conjure doctor) (1871–1962), American conjure doctor and businessman

== See also ==
- James Jorden (1954–2023), American blogger, journalist and music critic
- James Jordon (born 2000), Australian footballer
- Jordan James (disambiguation)
