= Jordan Jelev =

Bulgarian graphic artist (born 1975)

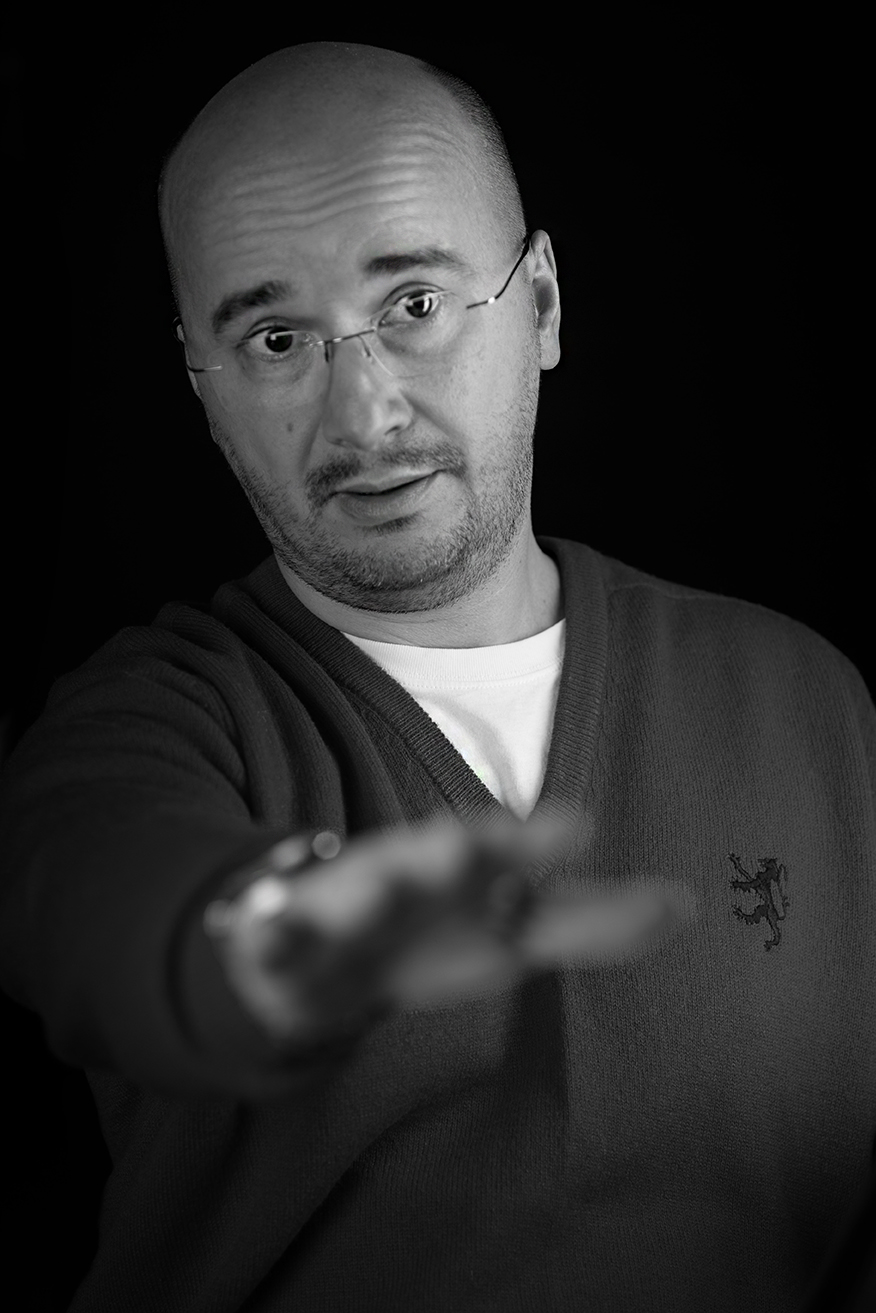
- Born: Jordan Jivkov Jelev; 14 June 1975 (age 51); Varna, Bulgaria
- Education: University of Economics Varna
- Occupations: graphic designer typeface designer calligrapher
- Years active: 1996-present
- Spouse: Elitsa Jeleva
- Children: 2
- Website: www.thelabelmaker.eu

Jordan Jelev (Bulgarian: Йордан Желев; born 14 June 1975), known also as The Labelmaker, is a Bulgarian graphic and typeface designer, and calligrapher.

== Biography ==
=== Early years ===
Jelev was born on 14 June 1975 in Varna, Bulgaria. His affiliation to visual arts dates back to the age of 12 when he created his first hand-made signs embroidered on jeans. Later at the end of his study at Varna High-school of Math, he discovered his love for calligraphy and custom lettering which influenced significantly his work as graphic designer.

=== Professional career ===
In 1996, he started his education at Varna University of Economics. Right at the same time he began working as graphic designer in Zograph Studio. In 1998 he moved to Factor R studio in Varna where he started his career as dedicated wine label designer. Since that time he had successfully designed a considerable amount of premium brands – most of them later recognized as some of the icons of Bulgarian Wine and Spirits industry.

In 2003, he started making professional photography for wine and spirits industry. In 2005 he did his first solo exhibition with macro and abstract photography in Varna.

Since 2010, he started working for different wineries in Barossa Valley - Australia, Napa Valley - USA, Fair Haven, NY - USA, Languedoc - France, FYRO Macedonia, Lombardy - Italy, Rheinhessen - Germany etc. His work was featured by some of the world's famous design blogs like Packaging of the Word, Lovelypackage, The Dieline, World Packaging Design etc.

As author of Bulgarian wine label designs, Jelev received "the Labelmaker" nickname which eventually turned into his own signature and personal brand.

== Awards ==
- 2001, Stalker Award
- 2009, 1st Prize for wine label designs / National Vine and Wine chamber of Bulgaria
- 2011, Best Wine Label award / Vinaria Wine Expo
- 2012, Gold Medal for Best wine label for Stallion Red Wine / San Francisco International Wine Competition
- 2013, Bronze Medal for Best wine label for White Stallion Wine / San Francisco International Wine Competition
- 2013, Stalker Award
- 2014, Gold Medal for Best Wine Label Design at BIWC for Salty Hills wines
- 2015, Double Gold Packaging Award for Colloca Estate 2013 Riesling at the 2015 Fingerlakes International Wine Competition
- 2016, Silver Medal, Packaging Design – Color & Type for PIXELS, Rose at Los Angeles International Wine Competition
- 2016, Gold Medal, Packaging Design – Contemporary for PIXELS, Sauvignon Blanc at Los Angeles International Wine Competition
- 2017, 2nd Prize for Best Wine Label Design at Rose Wine Expo, Kazanlak for Golden Rhythm Rose by Black Sea Gold, Pomorie
- 2017, 1st Prize for Best Wine Label Design at Rose Wine Expo, Kazanlak for Orbelia Rose by Orbelia Winery
- 2017, Grand Prix for Best Wine Label Design at Rose Wine Expo, Kazanlak for SOULMATEs wines by Stratsin Winery
- 2017, Gold Medal for Best Wine Label Design at BIWC for SOULMATEs wines
- 2021, Pentawards Bronze for Dogma Black Sea Aged Wines
- 2022, Grand Prix for Best Wine Label Design at Rose Wine Expo, Kazanlak for DOGMA wines
- 2022, Best Label Design Trophy at BIWC for Gorun Winery
- 2023, 1st place for Package Redesign at the Wine Business PACK Design Awards for Bien Nacido Estate Black Tier
