= Jordan Miller =

Jordan Miller may refer to:

- Jordan Miller (figure skater), American figure skater
- Jordan Miller (defensive lineman, born 1988), American football nose tackle
- Jordan Miller (cornerback) (born 1997), American football cornerback
- Jordan Miller, lead singer & bass player for Canadian rock band The Beaches
- Jordan Miller (basketball) (born 2000), American basketball player
- Jordan Miller (defensive lineman, born 2000), American football nose tackle
- Jordan Miller (rugby league) (born 2005), Australian rugby player
