= Jordan Pereira =

Jordan Pereira may refer to:

- Jordan Pereira (volleyball) (born 1997), Uruguayan-born Canadian volleyball player
- Jordan Pereira (rugby league) (born 1993), New Zealand rugby league footballer
