= Jordan Roberts =

Jordan Roberts may refer to:

- Jordan Roberts (footballer, born 1993), English footballer
- Jordan Roberts (footballer, born 1994), English footballer
- Jordan Roberts (writer), screenwriter of Big Hero 6
- Jordan Roberts (American football), American football running back
