= Jordan Harris =

Jordan Harris may refer to:

- Jordan Harris (ice hockey) (born 2000), American NHL ice hockey player
- Jordan A. Harris (born 1984), American politician from Pennsylvania
