= Jordan Davies (disambiguation) =

Jordan Davies (born 1992) is an Ibiza Weekender and Ex on the Beach contestant.

Jordan Davies may also refer to:

- Jordan Davies (footballer), professional footballer
- Jordan Lee Davies, contestant on The Voice UK
- Jordan Davies (presenter) on Soap Fever
- Jordan Davies (rugby union) in 2015 Salford Red Devils season

== See also ==
- Jordan Davis (disambiguation)
