= Jordan Evans =

Jordan Evans may refer to:

- Jordan Evans (soccer) (born 1987), American soccer player
- Jordan Evans (footballer) (born 1995), Welsh footballer
- Jordan Evans (American football) (born 1995), American football player
- Jordan Evans (politician), politician from Massachusetts
- Jordan Evans (record producer) (born 1991), Canadian hip hop and R&B producer
