= Jordan Schwartz =

American Executive

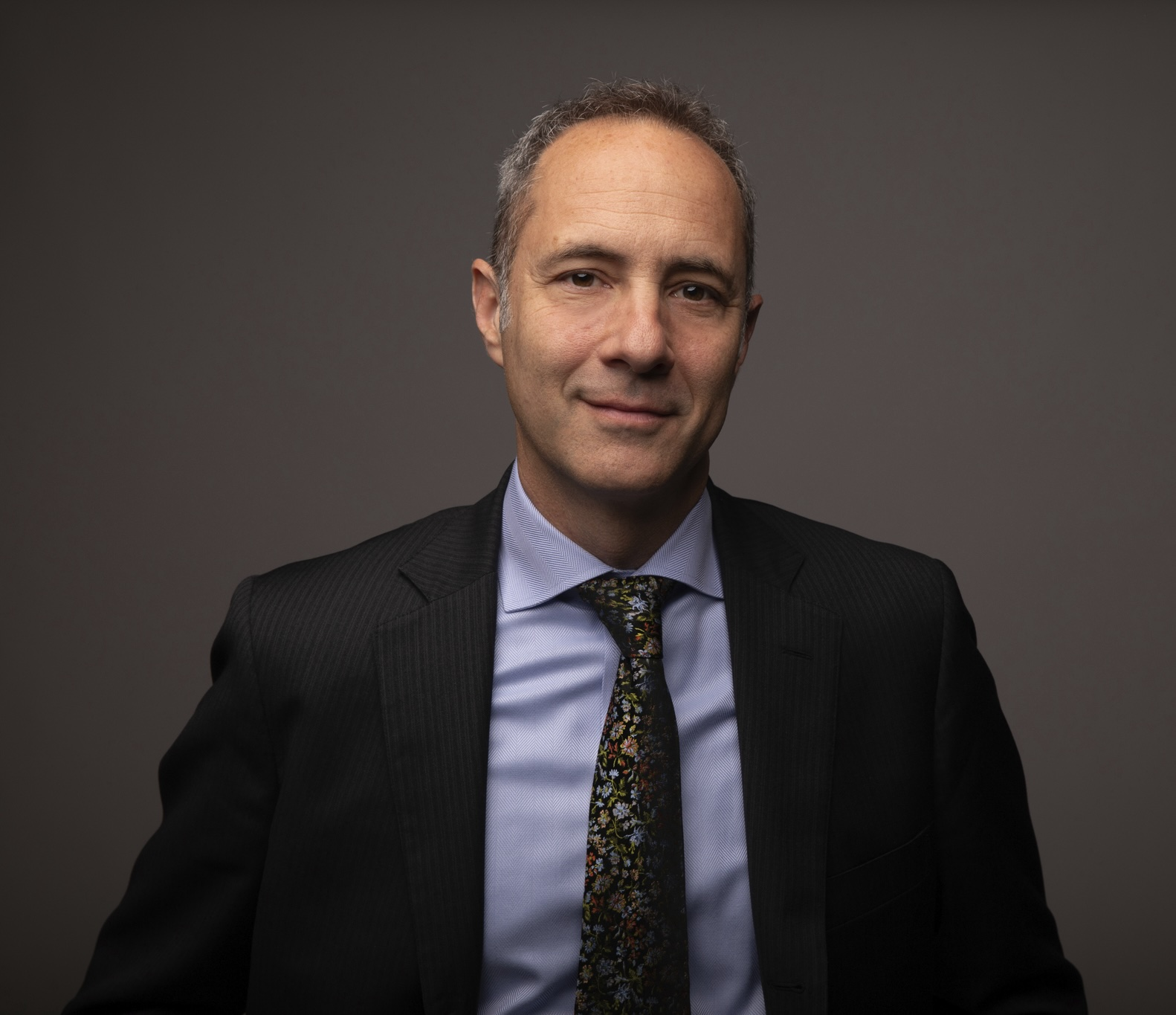

former IDB Executive Vice President
- In office 1 June 2023 – 31 May 2026
- Preceded by: Reina Irene Mejía
- Succeeded by: Everett Eissenstat

World Bank Country Director for Argentina, Paraguay and Uruguay
- In office 1 August 2019 – 2 February 2023
- Preceded by: Jesko Hentschel
- Succeeded by: Marianne Fay

Personal details
- Born: 23 October 1965 (age 60) Connecticut, United States
- Education: Georgetown University (MSc) Tufts University (BA)

Jordan Schwartz (born 22 October 1965) is an American executive in the field of financing for emerging economies. He was the Executive Vice President of the Inter-American Bank of Development (IDB).

== Education ==
Jordan Schwartz received a Master of Science degree from Georgetown University's School of Foreign Service in Washington, DC. He graduated with a bachelor's degree in International Relations from University of Tufts of Boston, Massachusetts.

== Career ==
Schwartz has worked in the field of economic development since 1991, focusing on infrastructure finance and regulation, sustainability, and the role of the private sector. He has held senior positions at the Inter-American Bank of Development and the World Bank, as well as in commercial consulting, and has worked across Latin America and the Caribbean, East Asia The Pacific, and Central Europe.

Schwartz held senior positions at Booz Allen Hamilton as a utility and transportation management consultant (1991–95) and at Deloitte Touche where he was Senior Manager for Infrastructure and Utilities (1995–1998), and .

Schwarz was the Director of the Infrastructure & Urban Development Hub in Singapore (2015–2017), and designed and led the Global Infrastructure Facility, the world's largest project preparation facility for private, sustainable projects. He was the World Bank's Director for Infrastructure Finance, Public-Private Partnerships & Guarantees (2017–2019), helping to diversify the use of guarantees across infrastructure sectors.

He was the World Bank’s Country Director for Argentina, Paraguay and Uruguay from 2019 and 2023, growing the World Bank's program of support to the Southern Cone during a prolonged economic, financial and health crisis. During this period, his teams provided the World Bank’s first major financing for COVID response and mRNA vaccines in the region, and secured financing for the completion of the Matanza-Riachuelo Wastewater Treatment System in Argentina, the largest sanitation investment program in LAC.

== Publications ==
Along with economists Luis Andrés and José Luis Guasch, Schwartz is co-author of the book Uncovering the Drivers of Utility Performance: The Role of the Private Sector, Regulation, and Governance in the Power, Water, and Telecommunication Sectors, as well as several articles focusing on the relationship between risk and investment.
