= Jordan Lucas (volleyball) =

American volleyball player

Personal information
- Nationality: Filipino American
- Born: 2004 (age 21–22)
- Hometown: Hacienda Heights, California
- Height: 6 ft 3 in (191 cm)
- Weight: 175 lb (79 kg)
- Education: Grand Canyon; Cal State Northridge; LIU

Volleyball information
- Position: Outside hitter
- Last updated: October 26, 2026

Jordan Lucas is an American men's volleyball player for Long Island University. He previously played for California State University, Northridge (CSUN). After playing for CSUN, Lucas announced he is transferring to play his final college season for the Long Island University (LIU) Sharks in New York. He also previously played volleyball with the Philippines men's volleyball team and Grand Canyon University. Jordan plays as an outside hitter. He has a large following on social media, and is famous for his viral celebrations which include finger snaps, hair flicks, and waving to opponents.

== Personal life ==
Lucas grew up in Hacienda Heights, California. He attended and played volleyball for Servite High School, Upland High School, and Los Altos High School. His Upland team won the CIF state championship in 2022. Lucas is gay.

His brother, Jarod, played college basketball at Oregon State and Nevada.
