= Jordan Mang-osan =

Filipino Indigenouism artist (born 1967)

Jordan Mang-osan (born 21 September 1967 in Acupan, Itogon Benguet) is a Filipino artist who harnesses the power of the sun to create pyrography drawings. Pyrography is the art of decorating wood or other materials with burn marks.

Mang-osan is an Igorot from the Cordilleras who stays true to his roots by working with raw indigenous materials and focusing on matters that celebrate the rich heritage of his people and his country.

He is one of the founders and current president of the Chanum Foundation, an organization founded in 1996, which aims to create an artist village in the middle of Baguio. It has since become a hub for art and a studio for budding artists all throughout the country.

== Career ==
Mang-osan started his journey with the arts at the age of 19. Using raw indigenous materials, he produced pieces depicting Cordilleran subjects on acrylic on canvas, mixed media, pyrography and solar drawing on various surfaces such as handmade paper and wooden panel.

He uses a magnifying glass to concentrate heat on select areas where he can burn drawings onto wooden boards. The heat etches darkened lines into the wood which result in a landscape or an elaborate portrait. He stays with his family at Bayabas Pico, La Trinidad, Benguet where he continuous to create unique art pieces while spending time with his family.
