= Jordan Hamilton =

Jordan Hamilton may refer to:

- Jordan Hamilton (basketball) (born 1990), American basketball player
- Jordan Hamilton (soccer) (born 1996), Canadian soccer player

== See also ==
- Hamilton Jordan (1944–2018), American politician
