= Jordan Kilganon =

Canadian basketball player

Personal information
- Born: April 28, 1992 (age 34) Sudbury
- Listed height: 6 ft 1 in (1.85 m)
- Listed weight: 180 lb (82 kg)

Jordan Kilganon is a Canadian professional slam dunker.

== Biography ==
Kilganon was born in Sudbury, Ontario, on April 28, 1992. He graduated from École secondaire du Sacré-Cœur, based out of Sudbury, Ontario. Jordan Kilganon graduated from Humber College in Toronto in 2015.

=== Dunking career ===
Starting at age 15, Kilganon started posting on YouTube some videos of his dunks. In 2021, Jordan Kilganon won Dunk League 3, a contest pitting the world's best dunkers against each other for a $50,000 grand prize. He is known for his athleticism and his dunks, such as the Hide-and-Seek, the 360 Scoop Elbow, the Roundhouse, the Lost And Found, and the Scorpion.

In December 2025, Kilganon competed in the Dunkman Championship, a 48-man tournament that featured elite professional dunkers from around the world and was broadcast on TNT. Kilganon won the championship with a 540 dunk and received a US$200,000 grand prize.
