= Saint Jordan =

Saint Jordan or Blessed Jordan may refer to:

- Saint Jordan the Wonderworker, remembered in the Eastern Orthodox church on May 2
- Saint Jordan of Bristol, venerated in England
- Blessed Jordan of Saxony (d. 1237), early leader of the Dominican Order
- Blessed Giordano Forzatè (d. 1248), Paduan religious whose body lies uncorrupted in Venice
- Blessed Jordan of Pisa (d. 1311), Dominican theologian
- Saint Giordano Ansaloni (d. 1634), Dominican missionary martyred in Japan
- Saint Jordan of Trebizond (d. 1650), remembered in the Eastern Orthodox church on February 2
