= Jordan Molloy =

Irish hurler

Personal information
- Native name: Siúrtáin Ó Maolmhuaidh (Irish)
- Born: 1999 (age 26–27) Kilkenny, Ireland

Sport
- Sport: Hurling
- Position: Midfield
Club
- Years: Club
- 2017-present: O'Loughlin Gaels
Club titles
- Kilkenny titles: 1
- Leinster titles: 1
- All-Ireland Titles: 0
Inter-county
- Years: County
- 2024-present: Kilkenny
Inter-county titles
- Leinster titles: 2
- All-Irelands: 0
- NHL: 0
- All Stars: 0

Jordan Molloy (born 1999) is an Irish hurler. At club level, he plays with O'Loughlin Gaels and at inter-county level with the Kilkenny senior hurling team.

== Career ==
Molloy played hurling at all levels during his time at secondary school with CBS Kilkenny. As a member of the school's senior hurling team, he lost consecutive Leinster PPS SAHC finals to St Kieran's College in 2016 and 2017.

At club level, Molloy first played for O'Loughlin Gaels at juvenile and underage levels, winning Kilkenny MAHC and Kilkenny U21AHC titles in 2017 and 2019 respectively. He won Kilkenny SHC and Leinster Club SHC medals in 2023. Molloy scored two points from wing-back when O'Loughlin Gaels were beaten by St Thomas' in the 2024 All-Ireland Club SHC final.

At inter-county level, Molloy first played for Kilkenny during a two-year tenure at minor level. He won a Leinster MHC in 2017 following a 3–15 to 1–17 win over Dublin in the final. Molloy progressed to the under-20 team and won a leinster U20HC medal as a non-playing substitute in 2019.

Molloy joined the senior team in 2024. He won consecutive Leinster SHC medals in 2024 and 2025.

== Honours ==
O'Loughlin Gaels

- Leinster Senior Club Hurling Championship: 2023
- Kilkenny Senior Hurling Championship: 2023
- Kilkenny Under-21 A Hurling Championship: 2019
- Kilkenny Minor A Hurling Championship: 2017

Kilkenny

- Leinster Senior Hurling Championship: 2024, 2025
- Leinster Under-20 Hurling Championship: 2019
- Leinster Minor Hurling Championship: 2017
