= Jordan Zietz =

American entrepreneur

- Education: Stanford University (BS)
- Occupation: Entrepreneur
- Title: CEO of LemonLime

Jordan Zietz is an entrepreneur and the co-founder and CEO of LemonLime, a San Francisco-based artificial intelligence startup. A 2024 graduate of Stanford University, he drew criticism in July 2026 after promoting an offer of job interviews to party guests who got LemonLime tattoos.

Before LemonLime, Zietz gained national attention as the 44th Stanford Tree, the university's unofficial mascot, a role from which he was suspended in 2022 for displaying a banner that read "Stanford Hates Fun" on the field during a football game. His other prior ventures include founding GameReef and All-Star eSports League, and co-founding the social app Confetti.

== Early life and education ==
Zietz is a Florida native and attended Pine Crest School. He studied management science and engineering at Stanford University, receiving a Bachelor of Science degree in 2024. From 2021 to 2024, he was a member of the editorial board of The Stanford Flipside, a student satirical newspaper. In April 2023, he appeared as a contestant on Wheel of Fortune, representing Stanford during the show's College Week Spring Break episodes.

=== Stanford Tree ===
During the 2022–23 academic year, Zietz served as the 44th Stanford Tree, the official mascot of the Leland Stanford Junior University Marching Band and the unofficial mascot of the university.

On October 22, 2022, during the Stanford University football game against Arizona State, Zietz and three other students, including Arizona State's mascot, carried a 40-foot banner across the field which read "Stanford Hates Fun". The slogan referred to student complaints about the university administration's handling of social life.

Following the stunt, the band's executive committee suspended Zietz from the role. The committee said the decision concerned his use of the position "for personal benefit" and was unrelated to the banner's message.

A student-led campaign protested Zietz's suspension and the university's social-life policies at the November 5 football game against Washington State, including the creation of a petition calling for Zietz's reinstatement which attracted over 700 signatures.

In 2023, Zietz judged auditions for the role and selected Emily Rodriguez as his successor.

== Career ==
=== Early businesses ===
Zietz started his first business, GameReef, through a Young Entrepreneurs Academy program supported by the Boca Raton Chamber of Commerce. In 2019, he founded the All-Star eSports League, which offered free, sponsor-funded competitions through which high school esports clubs could compete against one another and pursue college scholarships.

Zietz later co-founded Confetti, a social networking platform.

=== LemonLime ===
In early 2026, Zietz co-founded San Francisco artificial intelligence startup LemonLime alongside co-founder Daniela Muñoz. The company develops software to automate sales and marketing for small businesses. The company joined Y Combinator's Summer 2026 batch.

==== Tattoo controversy ====
In July 2026, during Y Combinator's Startup School weekend, Zietz hosted an afterparty at LemonLime's San Francisco office. Y Combinator told Inc. that it had neither sponsored the party nor included it in Startup School. In a since-deleted LinkedIn post, Zietz wrote that the company had brought a tattoo artist to the party and offered an "instant interview" to anyone who got a LemonLime tattoo; according to the post, seven people received tattoos. Zietz told Inc. that he, Muñoz and other LemonLime team members also received tattoos.

The post drew widespread criticism online. Zietz later deleted the posts and apologized. He described the event as "reckless" and said it had shown poor judgment by appearing to tie a permanent tattoo to a job opportunity. He said participants had chosen their own tattoos, that no one had been asked to get the company logo, that interviews had been available to everyone and that LemonLime would cover removal costs for anyone who later regretted a tattoo. In an August 2026 interview with Wired, Zietz said that some of those tattooed had not been seeking jobs.
