= Jordan Adams =

Jordan Adams may refer to:

- Jordan Adams (basketball, born 1994), American men's basketball player
- Jordan Adams (basketball, born 1981), American-Canadian former women's basketball player

== See also ==
- Jordyn Adams (born 1999), American baseball player
