= Jordan Johnson =

Jordan Johnson may refer to:

- Jordan Johnson (footballer) (born 1986), British Virgin Islands footballer
- Jordan Johnson (fighter) (born 1988), mixed martial arts
- Jordan Johnson (cricketer) (born 2005), West Indian cricketer
- Jordan Johnson (EastEnders), soap opera character
- Jordan Johnson, record producer and part of the Monsters & Strangerz
