= Jordan Seiler =

New York-based public space artist

Jordan Seiler is a New York-based public space artist known for his long-term project titled "PublicAdCampaign" for which he takes over billboards to use as canvases for his own pieces. Seiler's works are characterized by minimalistic formal style and concentration on graphic shapes. With Jowy Romano, he created an app called "No Ads" which attempts to replace advertisements in photographs taken with the phone with artwork.
