= Jordan Díaz =

Jordan Díaz may refer to:

- Jordan Díaz (baseball) (born 2000), Colombian baseball player
- Jordan Díaz (triple jumper) (born 2001), Spanish triple jumper
