= Jordan Oliver =

Jordan Oliver may refer to:

- Jordan Oliver (amateur wrestler) (born 1990), American freestyle and graduated folkstyle wrestler
- Jordan Oliver (professional wrestler) (born 1999), American professional wrestler
