= Jordan Thomas =

Jordan Thomas may refer to:

- Jordan Thomas (karateka) (born 1992), British karateka
- Jordan Thomas (American football) (born 1996), American football player
- Jordan A. Thomas, American attorney, writer, speaker and media commentator
- Jordan Thomas (footballer, born January 2001), English footballer
- Jordan Thomas (footballer, born May 2001), English footballer
- Jordan Thomas (American anthropologist)
