= Jordan Hill =

Jordan Hill may refer to:

- Jordan Hill (singer) (active from 1995), American singer/songwriter
- Jordan Hill (basketball) (born 1987), American professional basketball player
- Jordan Hill (politician), American politician
- Jordan Hill (ice hockey) (born 1989), Canadian ice hockey defenseman
- Jordan Hill (American football) (born 1991), American football defensive tackle
- Jordan Hill, Dorset, a hill in England
- Jordan Hill, Louisiana, a census-designated place in Winn Parish, Louisiana

== See also ==
- Jordan Hill Roman Temple, England
- Jordanhill, Glasgow, Scotland
- Hill (surname)
