= Jordan Lowe =

English cricketer (born 1991)

Jordan Richard Lowe (born 19 October 1991 in Rotherham, Yorkshire, England) is an English first-class cricketer. A right-hand batsman and wicket-keeper, Lowe was contracted to Yorkshire County Cricket Club, for whom he played one first-class match in 2010.

Lowe was educated at Winterhill School, Kimberworth, Rotherham. He joined Yorkshire in 2009. He has played for the Yorkshire Academy in the Yorkshire ECB County Premier League, and the Yorkshire Second XI in the Second XI Championship, and appeared in his debut first-class match for Yorkshire against India A in June 2010, when he scored five runs in his only innings. His final game for Yorkshire Second XI was against Glamorgan's Second XI in Cardiff on 24 August 2010.

In the 2011 season, Lowe played a number of matches for Rotherham Town C.C., in the Yorkshire ECB County Premier League.
