= Jordan Gray (disambiguation) =

Jordan Gray (born 1989) is an English comedian and author.

Jordan Gray or Jordan Graye may also refer to:

== Sports ==
- Jordan Graye (born 1987), American soccer player
- Jordan Gray (rugby union) (born 1993), American rugby union player
- Jordan Gray (heptathlete) (born 1995), American heptathlete
- Jordan Gray (hurdler) (born 1971), American hurdler, 1992 All-American for the Ohio State Buckeyes track and field team

== Others ==
- Jordan Gray, pseudonym of Mel Odom (author)
- Jordan Gray, Girlfriends character played by Taran Killam
