= Jordan Owens =

Jordan Owens may refer to:

- Jordan Owens (footballer) (born 1989), footballer from Northern Ireland
- Jordan Owens (ice hockey) (born 1986). Canadian ice hockey player
