= Jordan Lee =

Jordan Lee may refer to:

- Jordan Lee (basketball) (born 2006), American basketball player
- Jordan Lee (fisherman) (born 1991), American fisherman
- Jordan Lee (footballer) (born 1996), English footballer
- Jordan Lee (tennis) (born 2010), American tennis player
