= Jordan Murphy =

Jordan Murphy may refer to:

- Jordan Murphy (American actor), American actor, host and producer
- Jordan Murphy (English actor) (born 1988), British actor
- Jordan Murphy (basketball) (born 1997), American basketball player
- Jordan Murphy (footballer) (born 1996), English footballer

== See also ==
- Geordan Murphy
- Jordi Murphy
