= Jordan Murray =

Jordan Murray may refer to:

- Jordan Murray (American football) (born 2000), American football player
- Jordan Murray (Canadian football) (born 1997), American gridiron football player
- Jordan Murray (ice hockey), Canadian ice hockey player
- Jordan Murray (soccer), Australian footballer
