= Jordan Faison (disambiguation) =

Jordan Faison may refer to:

- Jordan Faison (basketball) (born 1994), American basketball player
- Jordan Faison (born 2004), American football player
