= Jordan King (disambiguation) =

Jordan King (born 1994), is a British racing driver.

Jordan King may also refer to:

- Jordan King (basketball) (born 2001), American college basketball player
- Jordan Wilson-King (born 1993), Australian Football League player

== See also ==
- List of kings of Jordan, a list of monarchs of Jordan
