= Jordan DeMercy =

American basketball player

Personal information
- Born: July 9, 1988 (age 37) Norcross, Georgia, U.S.
- Listed height: 201 cm (6 ft 7 in)
- Listed weight: 98 kg (216 lb)

Career information
- High school: Norcross (Norcross, Georgia)
- College: Florida State (2007–2010); Georgetown (Kentucky) (2011–2012)
- NBA draft: 2012: undrafted
- Playing career: 2012–2015
- Position: Forward

Career history
- 2012: Akita Northern Happinets
- 2013–2014: Bakersfield Jam
- 2014: Bambuqueros de Neiva
- 2015: Bukaros
- 2015: Caciques de Valledupar

Jordan DeMercy (born July 9, 1988) is an American professional basketball player who played for the Akita Northern Happinets of the Japanese bj league.

== College statistics ==
Year	Team	GP	GS	MPG	FG%	3P%	FT%	RPG	APG	SPG	BPG	PPG
2007–08	Florida State	31	0	9.7	.500	.300	.200	1.45	0.52	0.48	0.16	1.39
2008–09	Florida State	35	16	19.7	.375	.256	.581	2.57	1.71	0.77	0.34	3.06
2009–10	Florida State	21	0	14.2	.419	.214	.821	2.14	0.67	0.86	0.29	3.71
2010–11	Georgetown KY											
Career		87	16	14.8	.412	.254	.623	2.07	1.03	0.69	0.26	2.62

== Career statistics ==
Legend
GP	Games played	GS	Games started	MPG	Minutes per game
FG%	Field goal percentage	3P%	3-point field goal percentage	FT%	Free throw percentage
RPG	Rebounds per game	APG	Assists per game	SPG	Steals per game
BPG	Blocks per game	PPG	Points per game	**Bold**	Career high

Year	Team	GP	GS	MPG	FG%	3P%	FT%	RPG	APG	SPG	BPG	PPG
2012–13	Akita	14		16.1	.617	.556	.500	4.7	1.6	1.3	0.6	8.9
2013–14	BAK	5	0	6.9	.200	.000	.000	1.60	0.40	0.60	0.40	0.40
2015	Bucaros	15		29.7	.623	.282	.607	7.7	4.7	1.8	0.7	14.1
