= Jordan Richards =

Jordan Richards may refer to:

- Jordan Richards (American football) (born 1993), defensive back for the New England Patriots
- Jordan Richards (footballer, born 1993), English football defender
- Jordan Richards (footballer, born 1997), English football midfielder
- Jordan Richards (volleyball) (born 1993), Australian volleyball player
