= Jordan Beck =

Jordan Beck can refer to:

- Jordan Beck (baseball) (born 2001), American baseball player
- Jordan Beck (American football) (born 1983), former American football player
- a tributary of the Black Dub stream in Cambria, United Kingdom
