= Jordan Anagblah =

Association Football

Jordan Anagblah (1957–2014) was the Vice President of Ghana Football Association (GFA) and CEO of Might Jet.

== Career ==
He was the Vice President of Ghana Football Association and also served in various committees such as Chairman of Juvenile Football Committee, Emergency Committee Member and more.

== Achievement ==
He was part of the Ghanaian delegation that won the 2009 FIFA U-20 World Cup in Egypt.

== Death ==
He was sick and went for medical treatment in South Africa as a result of recovery, he later died at the Trust Hospital.
