= Jordan Fowler =

English footballer

Personal information
- Full name: Jordan Michael Fowler
- Date of birth: 1 October 1984 (age 42)
- Place of birth: Barking, England
- Height: 5 ft 9 in (1.75 m)
- Position: Midfielder

Youth career
- 2001–2003: Arsenal

Senior career*
Years	Team	Apps	(Gls)
2003–2005	Arsenal	0	(0)
2005	→ Chesterfield (loan)	6	(0)
2005	Dagenham & Redbridge	0	(0)
2005–2006	Kettering Town	0	(0)
2006	Havant & Waterlooville		
2006–2007	Bishop's Stortford		
2007–2009	Harlow Town		
2009–2010	Hemel Hempstead Town		
2010–2013	Wingate & Finchley		
2013	Harlow Town		
- * Club domestic league appearances and goals

Jordan Michael Fowler (born 1 October 1984) is an English former professional footballer who played in the Football League, as a midfielder.
