= Jordan de l'Isla de Venessi =

Jordan de l'Isla de Venessi was a minor Provençal troubadour from L'Isle-sur-Sorgue. He lived in the third quarter of the thirteenth century. He is generally believed to be the author of the decasyllabic canso "Longa sazon ai estat vas Amor", although that song is also attributed to seven other authors in the chansonniers. Jordan is identified with the Escudier de la Ylha (squire of the isle), who is the author named in chansonnier "R". "Longa sazon" forms the basis of the Italian poem "Umile core e fino e amoroso", which is practically a translation, by Jacopo Mostacci.

== Sources ==
- Jordan de l’Isla de Venessi, 276.1 at rialto.unina.it
- Jacopo Mostacci at rialto.unina.it
- Cavalier Lunel de Monteg (alias Peire de Lunel), 289.2 at rialto.unina.it
