= Jordan Davis =

Jordan Davis may refer to:

- Jordan Davis (soccer) (born 1983), American soccer player
- Jordan Davis (poet) (born 1970), American poet
- Jordan Davis (singer) (born 1988), American pop/country singer
- Jordan Davis (basketball) (born 1997), American basketball player
- Jordan Russell Davis (1995–2012), see Murder of Jordan Davis
- Jordan Davis (defensive tackle) (born 2000), American football player
- Jordan Davis (American football coach) (born 1992), American football coach

== See also ==
- Jordan Davies (disambiguation)
