= Jordan Baker =

Jordan Baker may refer to:

- Jordan Baker (The Great Gatsby), a character in the 1925 novel The Great Gatsby based on Edith Cummings
- Jordan Baker (umpire) (born 1981), American umpire in Major League Baseball
- Jordan Baker (soccer) (born 1996), Australian soccer player
- Jordan Baker, American actor in Edward Albee's 1994 play Three Tall Women
