= Jordan Walker =

Jordan Walker may refer to:

- Jordan Walker (baseball) (born 2002), American baseball player
- Jordan Walker (basketball) (born 1999), American basketball player
- Jordan Walker (politician) (born 1982/1983), Canadian politician
- Jordan Walker-Pearlman (born 1967), American film director
- Jordan Walker, one-half of country duo Walker McGuire
