= Jordan Clarke =

Jordan Clarke may refer to:

- Jordan Clarke (actor) (born 1950), American actor
- Jordan Clarke (shot putter) (born 1990), American shot putter
- Jordan Clarke (basketball) (born 1989), American basketball player, see Club Comunicaciones (Mercedes)
- Jordan Clarke (footballer) (born 1991), English footballer

== See also ==
- Jordan Clark (disambiguation)
