= Jordan Willis =

Jordan Willis may refer to:

- Jordan Willis (ice hockey) (born 1975), retired Canadian ice hockey goaltender
- Jordan Willis (footballer) (born 1994), English footballer
- Jordan Willis (American football) (born 1995), American football player
