= Jordan Hunter =

Jordan Hunter is the name of:

- Jordan Hunter (basketball, born 1990), New Zealand women's basketball player
- Jordan Hunter (basketball, born 1997), Australian men's basketball player
- Jordan Hunter (footballer) (born 1999), English footballer
