= University of Economics Varna =

Public university in Varna, Bulgaria

Coordinates: 43.209°N 27.9235°E

University of Economics – Varna
- Икономически университет – Варна
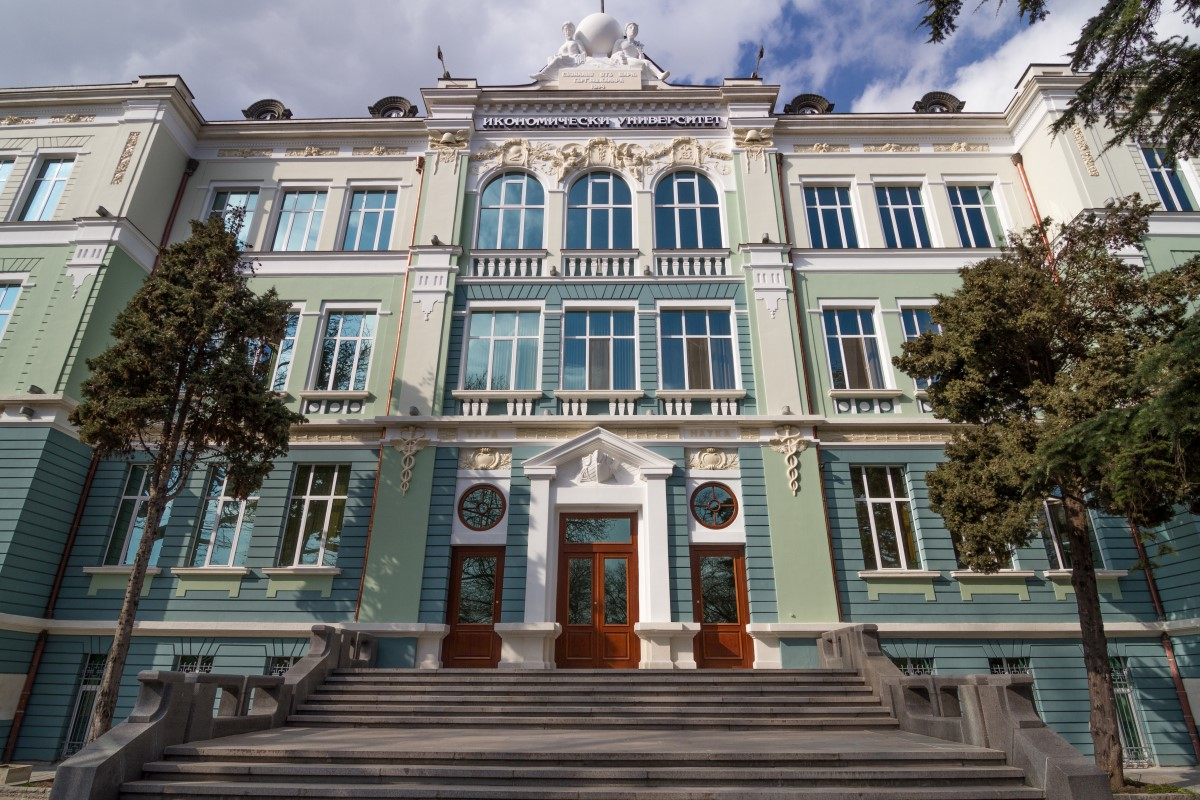
- Motto: "With academic traditions in the future"
- Type: Public
- Established: 14 May 1920
- Rector: Evgeni Stanimirov
- Students: ~11,000
- Location: Varna, Bulgaria
- Website: www.ue-varna.bg

The University of Economics – Varna is a public university located in Varna, Bulgaria, focused on studies in the field of economics. The university has an accreditation issued by the National Evaluation and Accreditation Agency.

The university is a higher educational institution with long history and its own traditions. It was founded on 14 May 1920 and was originally known as the Higher School of Commerce. It is the oldest university for economic sciences in Varna region and the second one in Bulgaria after Sofia University, which was founded in 1888. There are over 11,000 students at UE – Varna, including foreign students.

There are four faculties (Finance and Accounting, Economics, Computer Science, Management), Language Department and College of Tourism at the University of Economics – Varna. Students can obtain additional specialization and widen professional skills by completing short-term or long-term courses and language classes offered by the Lifelong Learning Center.

The university building is located next to the Sea Garden. The building has become a symbol of the city. In 2015, the building was awarded the Building of the Year prize. The facade reflects the influence of the French Renaissance and partly the classical Western European Baroque. The pediment placed above the main entrance is a masterpiece of the sculptor Kiril Shivarov. It is decorated by the images of two Greek gods: Hermes holding in his left hand a rod of merchants and Athena – a goddess of wisdom with an open book on her knees.

== Learning Structure ==
=== Faculty of Finance and Accounting ===
Departments:

- Accounting
- Finance
- General Economic Theory
- Law Science

=== Faculty of Economics ===
Departments:

- Economics and Construction Management
- Industrial Business
- Economics and Management of Trade
- Commodity
- Agricultural Economics

=== Faculty of Informatics ===
Departments:

- Informatics
- Statistics and Applied Mathematics
- Physical Education and Sport

=== Faculty of Management ===
Departments:

- Management and administration
- Marketing
- Economics and Organization of Tourism
- International Economic Relations
- Social sciences and humanities

=== Department of Language Learning ===
Departments:

- Western European languages
- Slavic languages

== Specialties ==
=== Bachelor programmes ===
Bachelor programmes comprise 4 years of study which include practical training, opportunities for double degree programmes, Erasmus+ and CEEPUS mobilities, etc.

Taught in Bulgarian

There are twenty-nine accredited programmes in four professional fields: Economics, Administration and Management, Tourism and Informatics and Computer Science:

Accounting and Auditing
Accounting and Finance
Finance
Insurance and Insurance
Construction Business and Entrepreneurship
Real Estate and Investments
Business Economics
Industrial Business and Entrepreneurship
Entrepreneurship and Investment Management
Logistics
Economics and Trade
Commodity and Customs Activities
Agricultural Business
Eco-Economics
Eco-Business and Regional Security
Informatics
Informatics and Computer Science
Business Information Systems
Mobile and Web Technologies
Management
Public Administration
Digital Media and PR
Court Administration
Marketing
Tourism
International Economic Relations

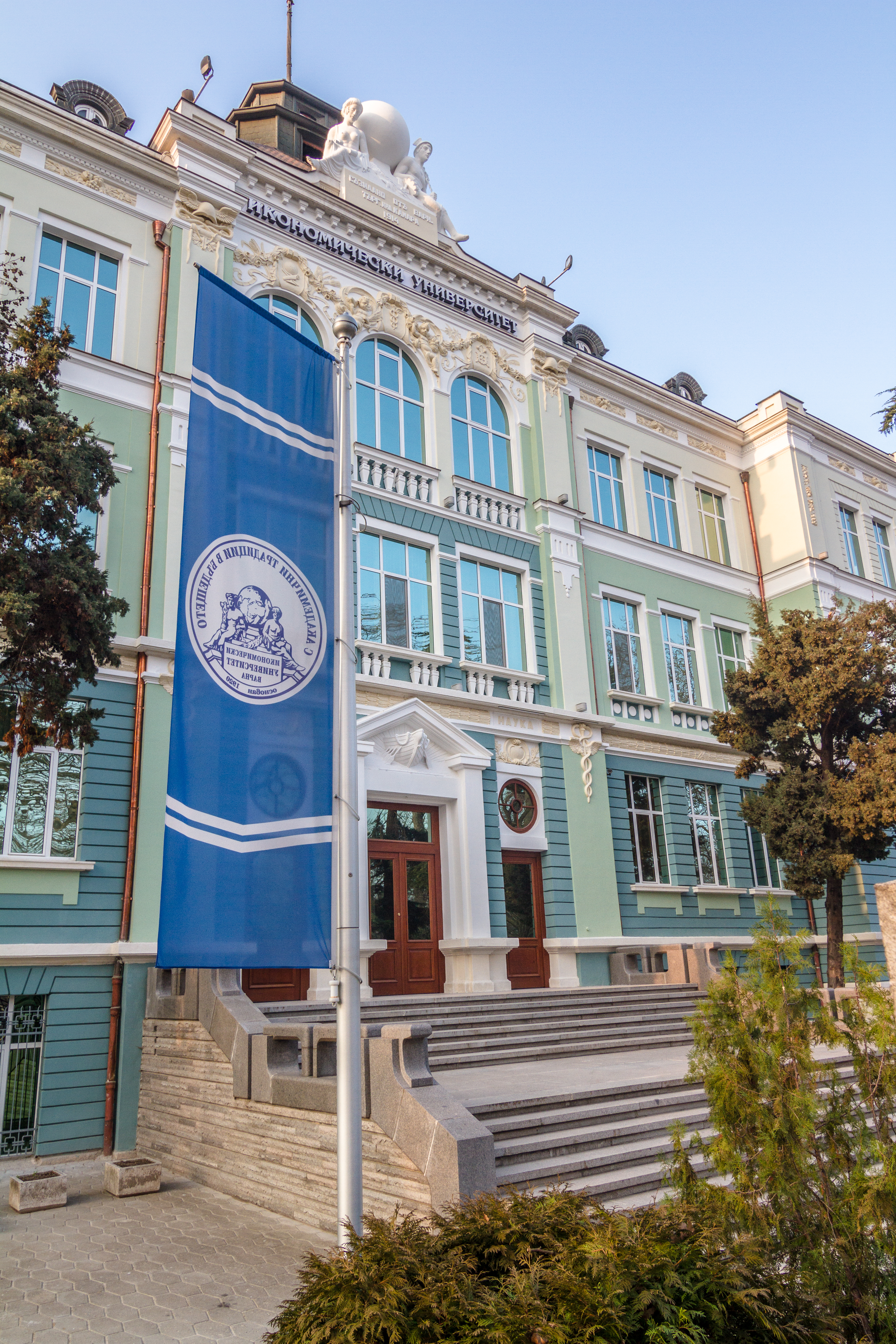
UE – Varna main building

Taught in English

Accounting
International Business

Taught in Russian

International Tourism

There is an opportunity for acquiring a second bachelor's degree in International Management (180 ECTS) from Worms University of Applied Sciences, Germany and in International Business (210 ECTS) from Seinäjoki University of Applied Sciences, Finland.

=== Master programmes ===
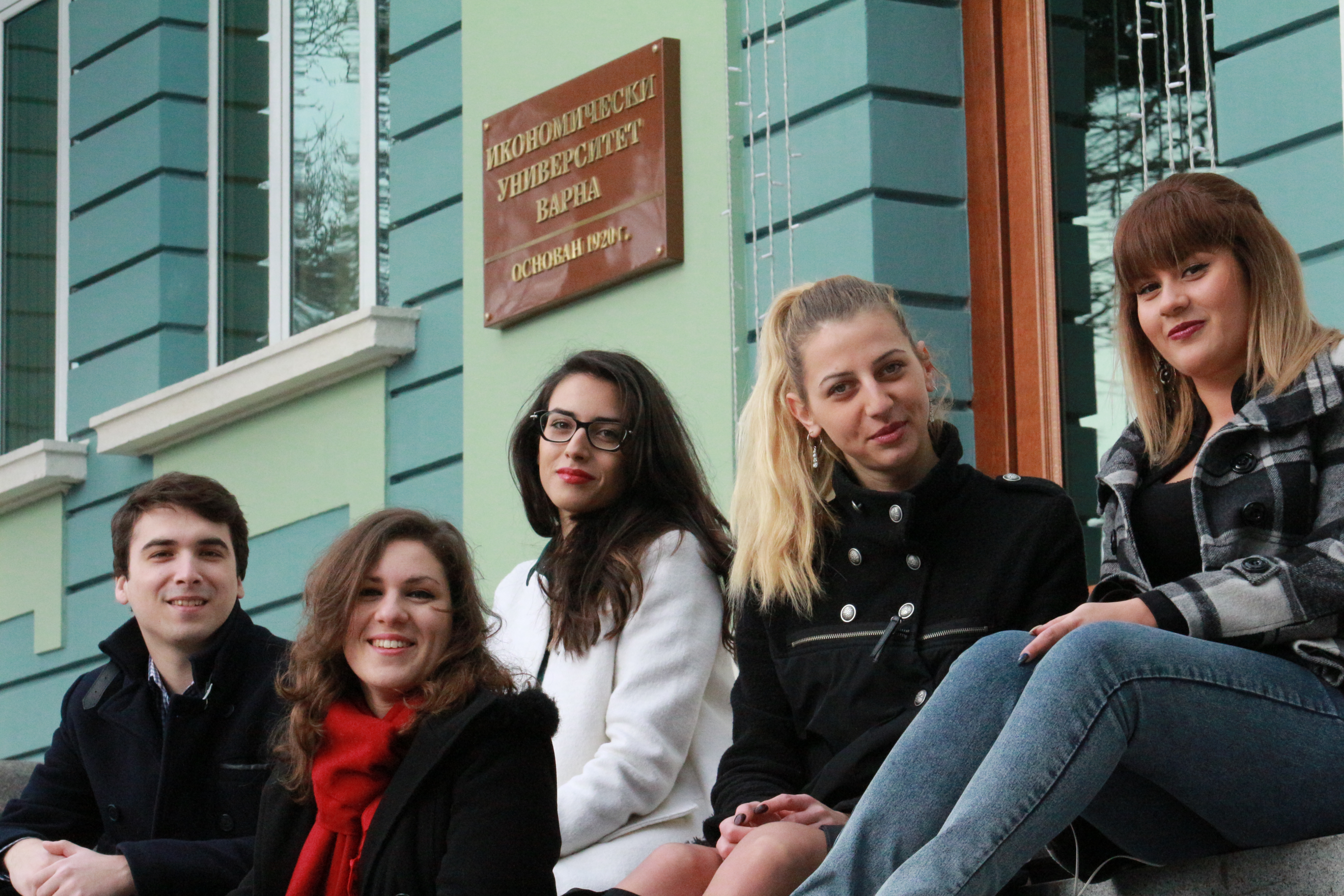
Students of the University of Economics – Varna

Master's degree programmes are offered in English or in Bulgarian.

Taught in Bulgarian

Accounting and Control
Public Finance
Bank Management
Corporate Finance
Finance and Innovation
Construction Entrepreneurship
Real Estate and Investments
Business Economics
Project Management
Corporate Business and Management
Logistics Management
Global Commercial Business
Quality and Expertise of the Goods
Agricultural Business
Business Consulting
Business Information Systems
Sales Management and Merchandising
Advertising and Media Communications
Corporate Marketing
Communications and Business Development
Marketing and Brand Management
International Business
Competitive and Business Intelligence
Social Research and Consulting
Information Management in Business
Organisational Management
Human Resources Management
Public Management and Administration Authority
International Tourism Business
Informatics
Mobile and Web Technologies

Taught in English

International Business and Economics
International Business and Management
Computer Science

=== PhD programmes ===
Master's degree graduates are eligible for a doctoral degree. It is done in five professional fields: Economics, Administration and Management, Tourism, Informatics and Computer Science and Law. The University of Economics – Varna offers the following PhD programmes in Bulgarian and English:

Social Management
Political Economics (General Economic Theory)
Finance
Accounting, Control and Business Analysis
Economics and Management (Construction and Real Estate)
Economics and Management (Trade)
Industrial Business
Agricultural Business
Commodity
Marketing
Statistics and Demographics
Application of Computing Equipment in the Economics
World Economy and International Economic Relations
Optimal Management of Economic Systems
Economics and Management (Tourism)
Informatics
Commercial Law
Labor Law and Social Security

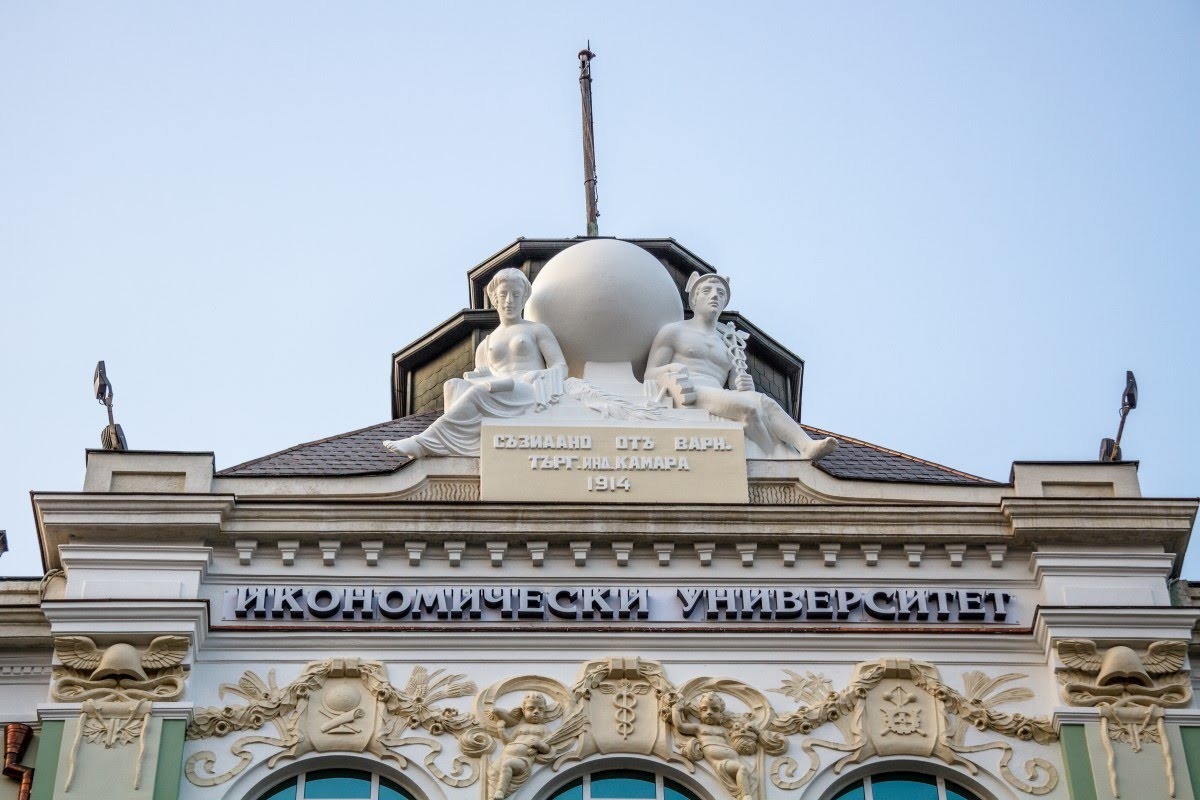
The pediment above the main entrance

UE – Varna aims to evolve the academic environment, internationalization and the diversity of cultural life. Integration into the European Union's education system contributes to the quality and efficiency of education. The university offers variety of exchange opportunities through Erasmus+ programme, CEEPUS, EEA grants and agreements with the partner universities from around the globe.

Double-degree programmes for both bachelor's and master's degree students are available at UE – Varna. Bilateral agreements with the universities in the UK, Russia, Finland, Germany, India give the students the opportunity to invest in their academic, professional and life experience.
