= Jordan Morgan =

Jordan Morgan may refer to:

- Jordan Morgan (basketball) (born 1991), American basketball player
- Jordan Morgan (American football, born 1994), American football offensive guard
- Jordan Morgan (American football, born 2001), American football offensive tackle
