= Jordan Marshall =

Jordan Marshall may refer to:

- Jordan Marshall (American football) (born 2005), American football player
- Jordan Marshall (footballer, born 1993), English footballer
- Jordan Marshall (footballer, born 1996), English footballer
