= Jordan Crane =

Jordan Crane may refer to:

- Jordan Crane (cartoonist) (born 1973), American comics creator
- Jordan Crane (rugby union) (born 1986), English rugby union player
- Senator Jordan Crane, fictional Illinois senator on the AMC series Hell on Wheels
