= Jordan Wright (disambiguation) =

Jordan Wright (born 1991) is an American mixed martial artist.

Jordan Wright may also refer to:

- Jordan Wright (footballer) (born 1999), English footballer
- Jordan Wright (politician), member of the New York State Assembly
- Jordan Wright (TV personality) (1992–2026), English television personality on Ex on the Beach
