= Jordan White (ice hockey) =

Canadian ice hockey player

- Born: March 12, 1988 (age 37) Surrey, British Columbia, Canada
- Position: Goaltender
- NHL team: San Jose Sharks

Jordan White (born March 12, 1988) is a Canadian ice hockey goaltender known for his one-day amateur contract as an emergency backup goalie with the San Jose Sharks in 2011.

== Early life ==
White was born in Surrey, British Columbia. He played with the University of British Columbia Thunderbirds of the Canada West Universities Athletic Association hockey league.

== Career ==
White made headlines for signing a one-day amateur contract as an emergency backup goalie with the San Jose Sharks of the National Hockey League on January 20, 2011. The situation occurred when the Sharks' regular backup goalie got hurt during the morning practice on the game day. He wore number 35 for the Sharks game but did not see any on-ice game time.
