= Jordan Smith =

Jordan Smith may refer to:

== Sports ==
- Jordan Smith (American football) (born 1998), American football defensive end
- Jordan Smith (pitcher) (born 1986), American professional baseball player
- Jordan Smith (outfielder) (born 1990), American professional baseball outfielder
- Jordan Smith (cricketer) (born 1998), Bermudian cricketer
- Jordan Smith (Costa Rican footballer) (born 1991), Costa Rican association football player
- Jordan Smith (English footballer) (born 1994), English football goalkeeper
- Jordan Smith (fighter) (born 1984), American professional mixed martial artist
- Jordan Smith (golfer) (born 1992), English professional golfer
- Jordan Smith (rower) (born 1979), American rower and rowing coach
- Jordy Smith (born 1988), South African surfer

== Other ==
- Jordan W. Smith (1865–1948), physician and political figure in Nova Scotia, Canada
- Jordan Patrick Smith (born 1989), Scottish-born Australian actor
- Jordan Randall Smith (born 1982), American conductor
- Jordan Smith (musician) (born 1993), American singer and musician, winner of Season 9 of The Voice
- Jordan Smith (poet) (born 1954), American poet and professor.
