= Jordan Baker-Caldwell =

American sculptor

Jordan Baker-Caldwell (born 1983) is an American artist known for his large scale abstract and figurative works—such as his 9-foot-tall steel sculpture Ascension, which is permanently installed in Midtown Manhattan.
