= Jordan Samuels =

American actor, dancer and singer

Jordan Samuels is an American actor, dancer, and singer.

== Early life and training ==
Originally from New York, New York, Samuels began his dance training at the age of three, after his family moved to Columbia, South Carolina. He studied ballet, jazz, and tap at various dance studios, including the Columbia City Ballet School, where he would return as a teenager to dance and compete with the Southern Strutt Dance Studio in Irmo, South Carolina.

At the age of 10, he had a recurring role on Fried Dynamite on Cartoon Network. After a move back to New York City at the age of 12, to attend the summer program at the School of American Ballet. Jordan also accepted a full scholarship to study ballet at the Jacqueline Kennedy Onassis School at American Ballet Theatre and Steps on Broadway, also in New York. At 12, he also starred as "Boo Hoo" in Dr. Seuss' How the Grinch Stole Christmas! The Musical on Broadway, from 2007-2008. He also appeared in television commercials for McDonald's, Sears and U.S. Cellular.

== Career ==
Samuels was one of the original ten finalists for the role of "Billy" in the Broadway production of Billy Elliot the Musical. He subsequently played the role of "Boo Hoo" in the Broadway production of Dr. Seuss' How the Grinch Stole Christmas! For two years, Samuels appeared in the first national tour of Newsies the Musical, in the role of "Specs."

Of his work on the show, a critic for the Chicago Tribune wrote: "But for me, this show was, is and ever more, will be all about Specs, the newsie with the glasses who's charged with the most spectacular dance tricks. If you got a Specs, you got a show and the spectacular Jordan Samuels delivers, even if his name is buried in the cast list. Stars don't sell 'Newsies'! Specs sells 'Newsies'!"

In addition to his work on Broadway and national tours, Samuels has also toured Europe in a production of Romeo and Juliet and continues to teach dance, having served on the dance faculty at The School at Steps on Broadway in New York City and the Baltimore School for the Arts in Baltimore, Maryland.

Jordan currently appears in the ensemble of the Rafiki company of the national tour of Disney's The Lion King in the role of the "Acrobatic Trickster" and understudy for the role of "Ed."

== Awards ==
Samuels has won major dance awards. Among them, he was a ballet finalist at the Youth America Grand Prix, the international dance competition, in the Pre-Competitive Division.
