= Jordan Ross =

Jordan Ross may refer to:

- Jordan Ross (American football), American football player
- Jordan Ross (rugby league) (born 1984), English rugby league footballer
- Jordan Walker Ross (born 1990), American actor

== See also ==
- Jordan Roos (born 1993), American football player
- Jordan Rossiter (born 1997), English footballer
- Jordan Wilson-Ross (born 1989), Canadian rugby union footballer
