= Jordan Brown =

Jordan Brown may refer to:

== Sports ==
=== Association football ===
- Jordan Brown (Australian soccer) (born 1996), Australian soccer player who plays as a central midfielder
- Jordan Brown (footballer, born 1991), English footballer who plays as a left-back
- Jordan Brown (footballer, born 1996), English footballer who plays as a forward
- Jordan Brown (German footballer) (born 1991), German footballer who plays as a midfielder
- Jordan Brown (footballer, born 2001), English footballer who plays as a defender or midfielder
- Jordon Brown (born 1992), Scottish footballer who plays as a midfielder
- Jordon Brown (footballer, born 1994), English footballer who plays as a defender
- Jordan Brown (goalkeeper) (born 2004), American soccer player

=== Other sports ===
- Jordan Brown (American football) (born 1996), American football player
- Jordan Brown (baseball) (born 1983), American baseball player
- Jordan Brown (basketball) (born 1999), American basketball player
- Jordan Brown (snooker player) (born 1987), snooker player from Northern Ireland

== Others ==
- Jordan Brown (Prince Edward Island politician) (born 1980), Prince Edward Island Liberal politician from 2015 to 2019
- Jordan Brown (Newfoundland and Labrador politician) (born 1989), Newfoundland and Labrador New Democratic politician from 2019
- Jordan Brown (born 1997), American boy in Pennsylvania accused of shooting his father's fiancée in Jordan Brown case
