= Jordan Msumba =

Religious leader of Nyasaland (now Malawi)

- Born: Usisya, Nkhata Bay District, Malawi
- Occupations: Religious leader, preacher
- Known for: Founder of the Last Church of God and His Christ

Jordan Msumba was a religious figure active in colonial Nyasaland (present-day Malawi) in the early 20th century, best known as a co-founder of the African Independent Church known as the Last Church of God and His Christ.

== Early life and background ==
Jordan Msumba was born at Usisya in the area of Chief Mbwana, in what is today Nkhata Bay District, Northern Malawi to Tumbuka parents. In early 1900s, he received elementary education through the Livingstonia Mission system.

Between approximately 1907 and 1909, Msumba joined Elliot Kamwana Chirwa, the charismatic preacher of the Watch Tower Society in West Nyasa, becoming a lay preacher. When Kamwana was deported by the colonial authorities in 1909 due to his politically sensitive preaching, Msumba followed him to South Africa. There, he came under the influence of Joseph Booth and studied with other Nyasas under Booth's teachings, which combined Watch Tower doctrines with Sabbatarian influences.

In 1917, after being passed over for a hereditary leadership position, his uncle Balakaza had served under Chief Mbwana. Msumba returned to South Africa, re-engaging with the Watch Tower movement, now aligned with Kamwana rather than Booth. In 1920 he was repatriated from South Africa under circumstances described by authorities as mental instability, although the accuracy of this label is uncertain.

== Founding of the Last Church of God and His Christ ==
On his return to Nyasaland, or shortly thereafter, Msumba founded the Last Church of God and His Christ in either 1923 or 1924, as an African Independent Church that sought to integrate Christian faith with selected African cultural practices, most notably, it permitted polygamy and indigenous customs such as beer drinking.

The movement gained popularity among rural peasants in northern Malawi, distinguishing itself from mainstream missionary churches by its acceptance of traditional practices. It became one of the successful independent churches in the region during the inter-war period.

Historical scholarship on Msumba's church remains limited; one of the primary modern academic studies is Owen J.M. Kalinga’s 1982 article "Jordan Msumba, Ben Ngemela and the Last Church of God and His Christ, 1924–1935," which reconstructs the early history of the church and its founders.

=== Legacy and continuation ===
The Last Church of God and His Christ continued to grow through the 1930s and beyond, developing further into localized branches. Later histories, such as those by Makuni Gondwe (2018), explore its further developments, splits, and evolving practices into the post-colonial era.
