= Jordan Hicks =

Jordan Hicks may refer to:

- Jordan Hicks (American football) (born 1992), American football player
- Jordan Hicks (baseball) (born 1996), American baseball player
