= Jordan Morris (disambiguation) =

Jordan Morris (born 1994) is an American soccer player.

Jordan Morris may also refer to:

- Jordan Morris (cricketer) (born 1999), South African cricketer
- Jordan Morris (singer), contestant on UK's The X Factor series 11
- Jordan Morris (screenwriter) (born 1985), television writer, actor, author, and cohost of Jordan, Jesse, Go!, a weekly American comedy audio podcast
- Jordan Morris (Gaelic footballer) (born 2000), Irish Gaelic footballer
- Jordan Morris, poet commended in ACT Writing and Publishing Awards
