= Jordan Stewart =

Jordan Stewart may refer to:

- Jordan Stewart (footballer, born 1982), English footballer
- Jordan Stewart (footballer, born 1995), Northern Irish footballer
- Jordan Stewart (footballer, born 1996), Scottish footballer
- Jordan Stewart (speedway rider) (born 1998), Australian speedway rider
- Jordan Stewart (taekwondo) (born 1996), Canadian taekwondo practitioner
- Jordan Stewart, keyboardist with Emarosa
- Jordan R. Stewart (born 1845) American politician
