= General Jordan =

General Jordan may refer to:

- Amos Jordan (1922–2018), U.S. Army brigadier general
- Hans Jordan (1892–1975), German Army general
- Ricardo López Jordán (1822–1889), Argentine general
- Thomas Jordan (general) (1819–1895), Confederate States Army brigadier general and Cuban Liberation Army general

== See also ==
- Tadeusz Rozwadowski (1866–1928), Polish Army chief of general staff
- Jean-Baptiste Jourdan (1762–1833), French Army general
