= Jordan Scott =

Jordan Scott may refer to:

- Jordan Scott (filmmaker)
- Jordan Scott (poet)
- Jordan Scott (triple jumper) (born 1997), Jamaican triple jumper
- Jordan Scott (pole vaulter) (born 1988), American pole vaulter, winner of the 2010 pole vault at the NCAA Division I Outdoor Track and Field Championships

== See also ==
- Scott Jordan (disambiguation)
