= Jordan Matson =

Former U.S. Army infantryman

- Occupations: U.S. Army infantryman, foreign volunteer in the People's Protection Units (YPG)
- Known for: Fighting ISIS in Rojava, northern Syria

Jordan Matson is a former U.S. Army infantryman and one of the first foreign volunteers to fight within the People's Protection Units, also known as the YPG (Kurdish: Yekîneyên Parastina Gel) in Rojava, north Syria. Originally from Sturtevant, Wisconsin, Jordan left for Rojava to fight ISIS in October 2014. His reasons for doing so included dissatisfaction in his marriage but mainly frustration at the inaction by the U.S. government and the wider world. Matson told Fox6Now that he had grown up wanting to join the military and that "I was just done with it. Just done with watching these people die. And nothing being done about it". After being enlisted briefly in the U.S. military, he was sidelined, supposedly because of mental health issues, after seeing no action outside of the United States. He claimed that he still wanted to contribute militarily to serving his country.

Matson fought in Shingal, Iraq and Tell Tamer, northeastern Syria.

He currently lives in Sweden, with his wife and son.

== Accusations against Michael Enright ==
Matson has made various accusations against British YPG member Michael Enright. Enright, an actor living in the United States, had arrived in Syria as a volunteer to fight against ISIS. Matson made claims that Enright was a liability and in danger of being killed by his Kurdish fellow soldiers. He claimed Enright had been kicked out of four units he had been fighting with, and that Enright was there primarily to make a movie. Enright himself denied the claims, saying that he had the support of Kurdish generals, none of his fellow fighters wanted to kill him, and that it was the Kurds that asked him to make movie footage of the conflict. Kurdish military leaders, interviewed for the documentary Heval, refuted Matson's claims, stating that Enright had their support, they had asked him to take the footage, and that he was generally liked by his fellow combatants.
