= Jordan Clark =

Jordan Clark may refer to:

- Jordan Clark (softball)
- Jordan Clark (soccer) (born 1989), American soccer player
- Jordan Clark (cricketer) (born 1990), English cricketer
- Jordan Clark (actress) (born 1991), Canadian dancer and winner of So You Think You Can Dance Canada (season 4)
- Jordan Clark (English footballer) (born 1993), English footballer
- Jordan Clark (Australian footballer) (born 2000), Australian rules footballer
- Jordan Clark (American football) (born 2001), American football player

== See also ==
- Jordan Clarke (disambiguation)
