= Jordan Matthews (disambiguation) =

Jordan Matthews or Jordan Mathews may refer to:

- Jordan Matthews, American football tight end
- Jordan Matthews (attorney), American lawyer
- Jordan Mathews, American basketball player
- Jordan-Matthews High School in Siler City, North Carolina
