= Jordan Scarlett =

Jordan Scarlett may refer to:

- Jordan Scarlett (footballer) (born 1995)
- Jordan Scarlett (American football) (born 1996)
