= Jordan Young =

Jordan Young may refer to:

- Jordan Young (footballer) (born 1999), Scottish footballer for Gloucester City
- Jordan Young (pornographic actor) (born 1977), American actor, real name William "Billy" Kemp
- Jordan Young (producer), American television producer and writer
- Jordan Young (fighter), American MMA fighter
- DJ Swivel (born 1984), Canadian disc jockey

== See also ==
- Young (surname)
