= Jordan Jones =

Jordan Jones may refer to:

- Jordan Jones (Australian footballer) (born 1990), Australian rules football player
- Jordan Jones (basketball), American basketball player
- Jordan Jones (footballer, born 1994), Northern Ireland international football player
- Jordan Jones (Emmerdale), fictional character on Emmerdale
