= Senator Jordan =

Senator Jordan may refer to:

== Members of the United States Senate ==
- B. Everett Jordan (1896–1974), U.S. Senator from North Carolina from 1958 to 1973
- Len Jordan (1899–1983), U.S. Senator from Idaho

== United States state senate members ==
- Ambrose L. Jordan (1789–1865), New York State Senate
- Barbara Jordan (1936–1996), Texas State Senate
- Chester B. Jordan (1839–1914), New Hampshire State Senate
- Cornelius T. Jordan (1855–1924), Virginia State Senate
- Daphne Jordan (born 1959), New York State Senate
- David Lee Jordan (born 1934), Mississippi State Senate
- Emily Jordan (born 1984), Virginia State Senate
- Jen Jordan (born 1974), Georgia State Senate
- Jim Jordan (born 1964), Ohio State Senate
- Keith Jordan (born 1950), Tennessee State Senate
- Kris Jordan (born 1977), Ohio State Senate
- Luther Jordan (1950–2002), North Carolina State Senate
- Maryanne Jordan (born 1956), Idaho State Senate
- Nick Jordan (politician) (born 1949), Kansas State Senate
- Robert B. Jordan (1932–2020), North Carolina State Senate
