= Jordan Raf =

American singer

Jordan Raoufpur, better known by his stage name Jordan Raf, is a Los Angeles–based singer, record producer, multi-instrumentalist, and media artist. He was born in Dallas, Texas, and grew up in San Diego. He is of Persian and Jewish descent. His father was born and raised in Iran. He attended UCLA for art.

== Career ==
The first song he wrote after being released from the psychiatric ward was “Roses.” “Roses” pulls from his personal experiences with depression and anxiety. In 2016, Raf began gaining popularity on the internet for his songs “Roses” and “Duvet." He met journalist Jeff Weiss and signed to POW Recordings shortly after. On August 15, 2016, Raf was the featured guest on Dublab’s Friendly Futures Radio program with host Jake Jenkins. On September 2, 2016, Raf released an album, Double Negative, on POW Recordings. Raf has called Double Negative a break-up album.

== Style and influences ==
Zara Golden of The Fader called Raf “an L.A. singer with a knotty croon and a taste for slurrying, Shlohmo-like production.” He has said The Sopranos and Paul Thomas Anderson are his biggest inspirations. In an interview with Noisey, Raf called the video for “Duvet,” “a product of what happens when you read too much Freud and watch too much David Lynch and Bad Girls Club."

== Discography ==
- Double Negative

=== Singles ===
- “Frame”
- “Roses” was featured on Lauren Laverne’s playlist on BBC Radio
- “Duvet”
- “Hollywood” feat. Chester Watson

=== Music videos ===
- “Duvet”
- “Roses”
- “What You Wan't"
- “Asphalt”
