= Jordan Taylor =

Jordan Taylor may refer to:

- Jordan Taylor (softball) (born 1988), American softball pitcher
- Jordan Taylor (basketball) (born 1989), American basketball point guard
- Jordan Taylor (racing driver) (born 1991), American sports car racing driver
- Jordan Taylor (American football) (born 1992), American football wide receiver
- Jordan Taylor (YouTuber) (born 1991), American YouTuber
