= Jordan Lane =

Jordan Lane may refer to:

- Jordan Lane (politician), New South Wales politician
- Jordan Lane (rugby league) (born 1997), English rugby league player
- Jordan Lane, Canadian ice hockey player in 2010–11 Evansville IceMen season
