= Jordan Laws =

American singer

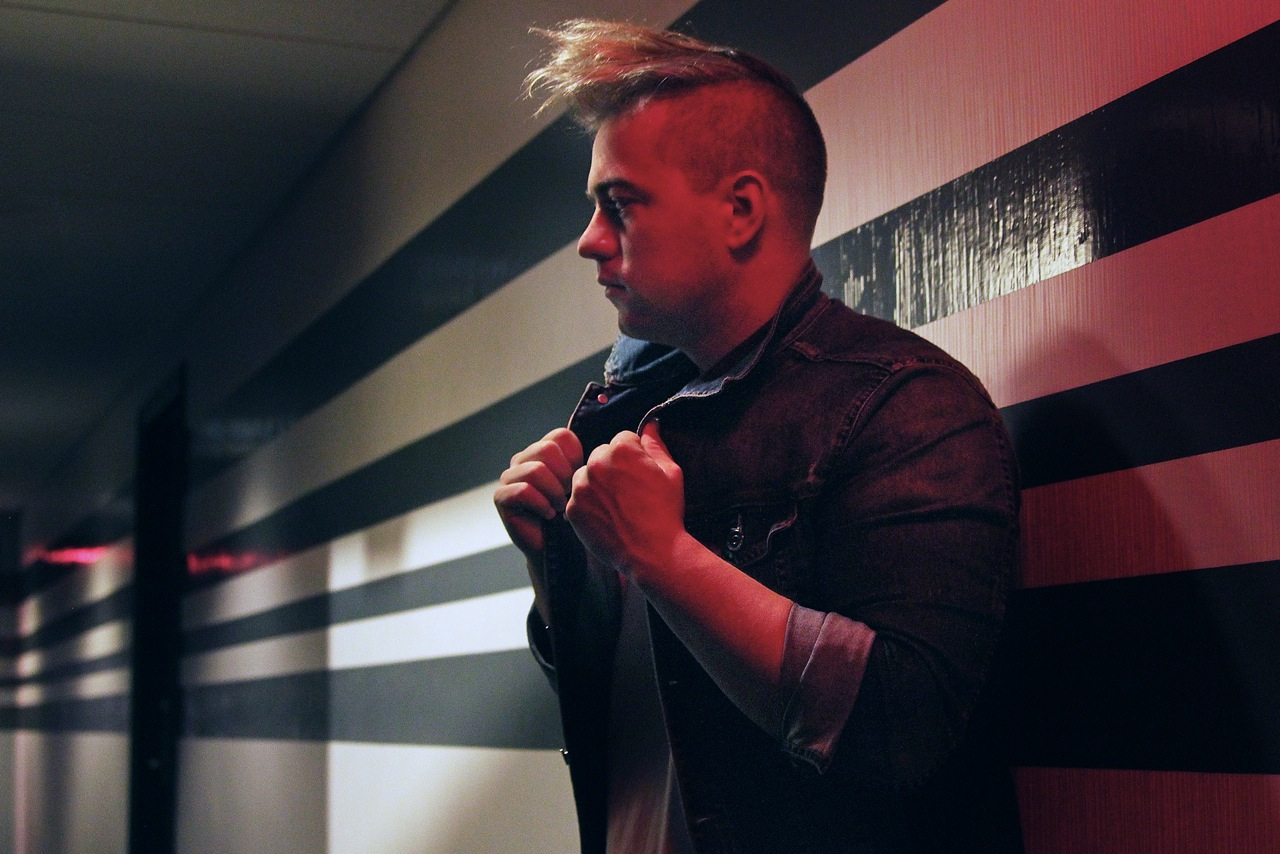
- Promotional photo of Laws from 2013

Background information
- Origin: New York City, U.S
- Genres: Electro house, Hip hop, Nu-disco, House, Nu-pop, pop culture, Synthpop
- Occupation(s): DJ, record producer, singer, songwriter, video editor, sound designer, composer, engineer
- Instrument(s): Vocals, Bass, Turntables, Personal computer, Drum machine, synthesizer, Sampler sequencer, ableton live, Serato

Jordan Laws is an American record producer, recording artist, and DJ. He has produced pop culture mashups, combining elements of music, film and television, and is an international performer. As a recording artist, he's served as a vocalist and songwriter, with two solo singles to his credit.

== Career ==
Born in New York City, Laws began his career as a DJ and production assistant. He worked as a member of the production team for Christina Aguilera's Grammy Award-winning Back to Basics album and on her single, "Ain't No Other Man".

Best known as an international DJ and record producer, Laws began in 2007 as the DJ and producer of Dwyane Wade's "All In" Converse ad campaign, which included music by Rick Ross and was directed by Little X. In 2008, Laws was the DJ for Kim Kardashian's Stoli Hotel tours. He was the guest DJ at the Producer Guild of America's 2011 DIGITAL 25: Leaders in Emerging Entertainment Awards and has been the official DJ for the Lenovo Consumer Electronics Show since 2013. Laws headlined South by Southwest in 2013.

Laws’ video work includes video mashups produced while with a video collective, Screenwerks, most notably Movie Line Rhymes, garnering attention from The Huffington Post, CBS News and the Today Show. Laws produced the Best of: Ultra 2011 Music Videos for Ultra Records, featuring artists including Steve Aoki, Above & Beyond, Wolfgang Gartner, Calvin Harris, Benny Benassi, Skrillex, and Will.i.am.

In 2020 Laws worked on the Bernie Sanders 2020 presidential campaign.

== Discography and videography ==
Year	Album/Song/Video	Artist/Label	Role
2006	Back to Basics	Christina Aguilera	Mixing Assistant
2006	"Ain't No Other Man"	Christina Aguilera	Assistant
2006	"Still Dirrty"	Christina Aguilera	Assistant
2006	"Thank You"	Christina Aguilera	Assistant
2007	Princess P	Paris Bennett	Assistant Engineer, Mixing Assistant
2008	Keeps Getting' Better: A Decade of Hits	Christina Aguilera	Audio Production, Mixing Assistant
2009	Street Hop	Royce da 5'9"	Vocals
2011	Best of: Ultra 2011 Music Videos	Ultra Records	Producer
2013	"Charm City"	Jordan Laws	Recording Artist
2013	"Feelin' Good"	Jordan Laws	Recording Artist
2007	"Flashing Lights" (Remix)	Kanye West	Producer/Remixer
2013	"Gun" (Remix)	CHVRCHES	Producer/Remixer
2013	"B.E.A.T" (Remix)	Selena Gomez	Producer/Remixer
2014	"Blow" (Remix)	Beyoncé	Producer/Remixer
2014	"Paradise Is You" (Remix)	La Roux	Producer/Remixer
