= Jordan Lutalo Evora =

Ugandan-Dutch kickboxer

- Born: June 3, 1979 (age 47); Uganda
- Other names: The Ugandan Punisher
- Nationality: Ugandan Dutch
- Height: 1.88 m (6 ft 2 in)
- Weight: 94.7 kg (209 lb; 14.91 st)
- Division: Cruiserweight Heavyweight Middleweight Light Heavyweight
- Style: Muay Thai Kickboxing
- Stance: Orthodox
- Fighting out of: Boca Raton Florida United States
- Years active: 14 (2001–2014)
- Last updated on: May 15, 2014

Jordan Lutalo Evora (born June 3, 1979) is a Ugandan-Dutch kickboxer and mixed martial artist. He was WFCA Cruiserweight Muay Thai champion, DFC 95 kg Slam Champion, and K1 MAX World Champion, fighting out of Vos Gym Amsterdam, Netherlands.

== Early life ==
Jordan Evora was born in Uganda. At the age of 18, he moved to the Netherlands alone. Growing up in the streets of Bijlmer he was often involved in street fights and began training in kickboxing at eighteen when he was found by his first trainer Lucien Carbin. Lucien Carbin ex kickboxing world champion took him the first time to the gym and started to work with him. After getting his "ass whooped" in his first day of training, he was motivated to improve. He had his first match at twenty and won by first-round knockout. Some of his early sparring partners included Alistair Overeem and Gilbert Yvel.

== Career ==
In 2001, his first year as a pro, he made his mark winning 12 fights that year. In 2004, he fought against Rafi Zouheir at the Battle of Zaandam and won his first European Muay Thai Title (WKN). In 2004 Evora also visited Japan to compete in Shootboxing where he lost to Ryuji Goto. Goto suplexed him in the final seconds of the fight to earn a well-received unanimous decision. His next fight in April 2005, was against Belgian Mohammed Ouali for another European Title (WPKL). Evora won the fight by unanimous decision. In December, 2005 at the A-1 Combat Cup in Duisburg, after three consecutive KO's in one night, Jordan Evora won his first tournament Championship.

On March 28, 2009, Evora participated in the first ever K-1 Heavyweight (-100 kg) Title tournament, held in Yokohama, Japan. He was beaten by Gokhan Saki in semifinals by right hook KO of the extra round Evora finally met rival Amin Sherifi at WFC World Fighting Championship II in what was widely considered a battle between the two best Muay Thai fighters in the world at their weight class for the W.F.C world title -93 kg. The fight was a close affair with Jordan knocking Sherifi down on the second round only for it to end with a controversial decision. In the third round Jordan managed to knock Sherifi out with a huge right hook causing the referee to stop the fight. However, due to the referee's misleading hand signals, Jordan rushed back in to knock Sherifi down once more, not sure that the fight had been stopped. After considerable confusion the fight was declared a no contest instead of a Jordan Evora KO win.

He faced Tony Valor Dominguez at Muay Thai Global 4 on March 9, 2011 in Las Vegas Nevada. Jordan won via one-punch KO with a right hook in the second round. Competing for the inaugural of Dubai Fighting Championship DFC MMA he fought in the Dubai Fighting Championship against Paul Daley in 2012 in Dubai at Palms Jumeirah. After defeating Daley via unanimous decision in the semi-finals, he then faced Craig Harriman in a highly anticipated rematch in the final. Midway through the opening round, Jordan threw a kick to Craig's left leg. Craig checked the kick, causing Jordan's lower right leg to fracture immediately and end the fight via TKO. Evora underwent surgery to repair his broken leg and should return to training in October 2013.

== Titles ==
- 2013 DFC Light Heavyweight World Championship Tournament Runner-up
- 2012 Liver Kick.com Fighter of the Year[34]
- 2011 Muay Thai Global 95 kg Slam Champion
- 2008 1st It's Showtime World 95MAX champion (Defense: 0)
- 2008 World Full Contact Association (W.F.C.A.) Thaiboxing World Cruiserweight champion (Defense: 1)
- 2008 KO World Series '08 Oceania winner
- 2007 1st SLAMM Events 79 kg class champion (Defense: 0)
- 2005 A1 World League winner
- 2005 W.P.K.L. European Middleweight champion (Defense: 0)
- 2004 World Kickboxing Network (W.K.N.) Thaiboxing European Middleweight champion (Defense: 0)
- M.T.B.N. Muay Thai Dutch Junior class -66 kg class champion (Defense: 0)

== Personal life ==
Jordan Lutalo is a single man with no children. He is the owner of two gym's in Amsterdam Netherlands and another Training Camp in Sandon South Africa. Recently opened a Mixed Martial Arts Academy in San Diego California. Recently named the richest fighter in Uganda, with a monthly salary of US$500,000. Jordan Evora has trained in America with Floyd Mayweather Sr. He is friends with mixed martial artists Rashad Evans, Alistair Overeem, Muhammed Lawal, Rodney Glunder and Jhonny Hendricks. He has helped all of them prepare for some of their fights. Jordan trains his physical conditioning at the ReAT Sports athletic performance facility in Amsterdam, under the Strength & Conditioning specialist Rayen Bindraban and currently training at the Jaco Hybrid Training Center in Boca Raton Fl.
