= Jordan James =

Jordan James may refer to:

- Jordan James (rugby league) (born 1980), Welsh rugby league footballer
- Jordan James (footballer, born 2004), Wales international footballer
- Jordan James (American football) (born 2004), American football running back

== See also ==
- James Jordan (disambiguation)
