= Jordan Karagavrilidis =

Czech ice hockey defenceman

- Born: March 24, 1958 (age 66)
- Position: Defence
- Played for: TJ CHZ Litvínov
- Playing career: 1976–1993

Jordan Karagavrilidis (born March 24, 1958) is a Czech former professional ice hockey defenceman.

He played the majority of his career with TJ CHZ Litvínov, playing 445 games for the team over 11 seasons. He began playing for the team in the 1976–77 season and after two seasons away he came back to play from 1979 to 1989. He then moved on to play in the lower leagues of Finland, Italy and Germany over the next four seasons before retiring in 1993.
