= Jordan Michael =

American soccer player (born 2009)

Personal information
- Full name: Jordan Michael de Oliveira
- Date of birth: June 17, 2009 (age 17)
- Place of birth: United States
- Position: Midfielder

Team information
- Current team: Flamengo

Youth career
- NYCFC
- –2025: Coimbra
- 2025–: Palmeiras
- 2026–: → Flamengo (loan)

International career
Years	Team	Apps	(Gls)
2026–	United States U18		

Jordan Michael de Oliveira (born 17 May 2009) is an American soccer player who plays as a midfielder for Flamengo on loan from Palmeiras.

== Early life ==
Michael was born on 17 May 2009 and was named after American basketball player Michael Jordan.

Born in the United States, he is of Brazilian descent through his parents and his grandmother has lived in Contagem, Brazil.

== Club career ==
As a youth player, Michael joined the youth academy of NYCFC. Following his stint there, he joined the youth academy of Brazilian side Coimbra after trialing with the club.

Subsequently, he joined the youth academy of Palmeiras in Brazil in 2025, where he trained with the club's senior team. Ahead of the 2026 season, he was sent on loan to the youth academy of Brazilian outfit Flamengo, helping the club's under-17 team win the 2026 U-17 Recopa Caricoa.

== International career ==
Michael is a United States youth international and is eligible to represent Brazil internationally through his parents. During the autumn of 2026, he was first called up to the United States men's national under-18 soccer team.

== Style of play ==
Michael plays as a midfielder. Brazilian news website RTI Esporte wrote in 2026 that he has "good vision, quality passing, and the ability to play in different attacking midfield positions".
