= Jordan Longino =

American basketball player (born 2002)

BC Körmend
- Position: Shooting guard
- League: Nemzeti Bajnokság I/A

Personal information
- Born: July 2, 2002 (age 24) Doylestown, PA, U.S.
- Listed height: 6 ft 5 in (1.96 m)
- Listed weight: 215 lb (98 kg)

Career information
- High school: Germantown Academy (Fort Washington, PA)
- College: Villanova University (2021-2025)
- NBA draft: 2025: undrafted
- Playing career: 2025–present

Career history
- 2025-present: BC Körmend

Jordan Longino (born July 2, 2002) is an American professional basketball player who plays for BC Körmend. He played college basketball for Villanova University.

== Early life ==
Longino attended Germantown Academy. While there, he played football and was a quarterback. In his junior year, he threw for nearly 2,000 yards and 16 touchdowns and rushed for 277 yards. He had interest from NCAA Division I schools, but chose to play basketball over football. He left Germantown as the school's all-time leading scorer. According to 247Sports, he was the 96th rated 2021 prospect in the rankings. He played AAU basketball for Philly Pride after playing football and in the summer of 2019 he received his first basketball scholarship.

In November 2020, he officially committed to Villanova University after giving a verbal commitment over the summer. He signed a National Letter of Intent alongside Angelo Brizzi, Nnanna Njoku, and Trey Patterson.

== College career ==
On November 11, 2021, Longino made his college debut against Mount Saint Mary's.

In March 2022, Longino had arthroscopic surgery on his left knee which prematurely ended his freshman season.

In January 2023, he was injured in a game against Georgetown University and suffered a strained left hamstring.

In April 2024, Longino shared the Villanova Attitude Award with Eric Dixon and the Jake Nevin Award with Chris Arcidiacono.

On January 24, 2025, he posted a new career high with 27 points and 5 assists against Marquette University.

On April 22, 2025, he entered the transfer portal. He didn't have any eligibility remaining.

== Professional career ==
In July 2025, after going undrafted, Longino joined the Houston Rockets for NBA Summer League.

On October 15, 2025, Longino signed with the Memphis Hustle. Before the 2025-2026 Opening Night, he was waived alongside Jordan Minor, Zhuric Phelps, Charles Pride and Kobe Webster.

On December 16, 2025, Longino started his professional career by signing with BC Körmend of Nemzeti Bajnokság I/A.

== Personal life ==
Longino father, Eric, played basketball at Southern Methodist University and his older brother, Evan-Eric played at Kutztown University and West Chester University.
