= List of The Wurzels band members =

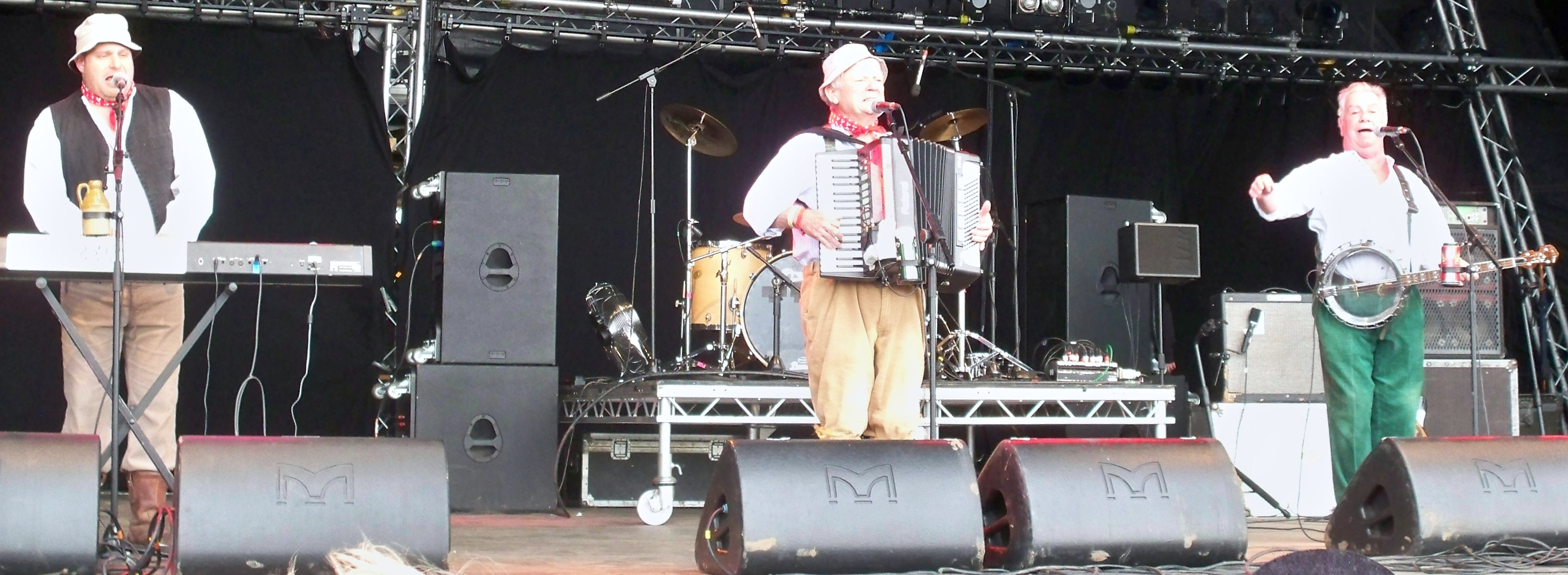
The Wurzels performing live in 2012.

The Wurzels are a British scrumpy and Western band from Nailsea, Somerset. Formed in early 1966, the group was originally known as "Adge Cutler & The Wurzels" and featured vocalist Adge Cutler backed by banjo and guitarist Reg Quantrill, accordion player Reg Chant, sousaphone player Brian Walker, and bassist John Macey. After Cutler's death in 1974, remaining members Pete Budd (vocals, banjo, guitar), Tommy Banner (accordion, vocals) and Tony Baylis (bass, sousaphone, vocals) continued as The Wurzels. Budd and Banner remain members of the current incarnation of the band alongside bassist Sedge Moore, who joined in 2007; additional backing musicians include drummer Lee Delamere (since 2021) and two keyboardists who perform regularly with the group – Louie "Gribble" Nicastro (since 2005) and Dan "Dribble" Lashbrook (since 2017).

== History ==
=== 1966–1974 ===
In June 1966, vocalist Adge Cutler met with band manager John Miles to discuss setting up a band to perform a number of songs he had written. Cutler had initially planned to call the group The Mangold Wurzels, but the pair agreed to shorten the name to simply The Wurzels. For the band's first show in July, Cutler was joined by Reg Quantrill on banjo and guitar, Reg Chant on accordion, and Brian Walker on tuba; bassist John Macey joined shortly thereafter. After signing with Columbia Records, The Wurzels' first recording took place live on 2 November 1966 at the Royal Oak pub in Nailsea, which spawned their debut single "Drink Up thy Cider", their first EP Scrumpy & Western, and their debut album Adge Cutler & The Wurzels. Around the release of the album and single "The Champion Dung Spreader" in March, Walker left the band and was not replaced, with the remaining four-piece recording "I Wish I Was Back on the Farm", second album Adge Cutler's Family Album, and "All Over Mendip" for release later in the year.

In the summer of 1967, both Chant and Macey left The Wurzels. Macey was not replaced, with Cutler and Quantrill performing for the next three months with stand-in accordion players Pete Shutler (of The Yetties) and Ken Scott. Chant's permanent replacement was Scottish accordion and piano player Tommy Banner, who joined The Wurzels in November. Around the same time, Melt Kingston joined on bass and tuba, taking over from Henry Davis who had been with group just a few weeks before joining The New Vaudeville Band; the following March, Kingston and Davis switched places, with Davis returning to The Wurzels. With Banner and Davis, the band recorded "Don't Tell I, Tell 'Ee", "Up the Clump", and third album Cutler of the West, before Davis left for a second (and final) time at the end of 1968.

Davis was replaced on bass and tuba in January 1969 by Tony Baylis. The lineup of Cutler, Quantrill, Banner and Baylis remained stable for the next five years, although only released one album – Carry On Cutler! in October 1969 – and two singles – "Poor, Poor Farmer" in 1971 and "Little Darlin'" in 1972 – due to a "heavy touring schedule". In early 1974, longest-serving member Quantrill left The Wurzels. He was replaced by Pete Budd, who had previously filled in for Quantrill on numerous occasions since 1972. Just a few months later, on 5 May 1974, frontman Cutler died in a car crash near the Severn Bridge. The remaining band members, "determined to carry on Adge's legacy and keep his name on the lips of scrumpy fans across the world", subsequently opted to continue on as a three-piece.

=== Since 1974 ===
After the death of Adge Cutler, new banjo player and guitarist Pete Budd took over lead vocal duties for The Wurzels. The band subsequently enjoyed their most commercially successful period, reaching the top 20 of the UK Albums Chart in 1976 for the first and only time with the album The Combine Harvester, as well as topping the UK Singles Chart with the lead single of the same name. In 1981, the band returned to a four-piece for the first time since Cutler's death with the addition of their first official drummer, John Morgan. After releasing "The Coughin' Song" in 1982 and Freshly Cut in 1983, bassist Tony Baylis left The Wurzels in January 1984. He was replaced by a former bandmate of Morgan's, Jai Howe; around the same time, Terry Pascoe (another of Morgan's former bandmates) joined as the band's first keyboardist.

Within a couple of years, both Howe and Pascoe had left The Wurzels. Mike Gwilliam subsequently took over on bass, debuting on the 1986 single "All Fall Down". Gwilliam also performed on the 1988 single "Sunny Weston-super-Mare", before he was replaced in late 1990 by Dave Wintour. After releasing two live albums and the single "I Want to Be an Eddie Stobart Driver", Wintour was replaced in 2002 by the returning Howe. Starting in November 2005, when Banner had to briefly step away from performing due to prostate cancer, Louie "Gribble" Nicastro – who had started working as a producer and songwriter for the group a few years earlier – filled in on keyboards and backing vocals. Nicastro ultimately remained with the band after Banner returned, and is still a member as of 2024.

In May 2007, it was reported that Howe had been forced to step down from The Wurzels due to "the onset of brain cancer". He had been replaced since February by Sedge Moore, who plays a variety of instruments in addition to bass. Howe later died as a result of his condition on 4 February 2008. The lineup of Budd, Banner, Moore, Morgan and Nicastro remained stable for around ten years, releasing A Load More Bullocks and The Wurzels Christmas Album in 2010 and 2011, respectively. Starting in 2017, Nicastro was forced to step back from working with The Wurzels full-time, so the band briefly worked with Steve Milliner, followed by Dan "Dribble" Lashbrook more regularly. On 18 December 2021, long-time drummer John Morgan died after contracting COVID-19 while on tour. He was replaced by Lee Delamere, who had earlier filled in for Morgan at a couple of shows towards the end of the year.

== Members ==
=== Current ===
Image	Name	Years active	Instruments	Release contributions
	Tommy Banner	1967–present	accordion; piano; vocals	all Wurzels releases from "Don't Tell I, Tell 'Ee" (1968) onwards
	Pete Budd	1974–present (plus as a stand-in from 1972)	lead vocals; banjo; guitar	all Wurzels releases from The Wurzels Are Scrumptious! (1975) onwards
	Louie "Gribble" Nicastro	2005–present (part-time from 2017 onwards)	keyboards; vocals	all Wurzels releases from A Load More Bullocks (2010) onwards
	Sedge Moore	2007–present	bass; guitar; vocals	all Wurzels releases from "One for the Bristol City" (2007) onwards
	Dan "Dribble" Lashbrook	2017–present (part-time)	keyboards; vocals	none to date
	Lee Delamere	2021–present	drums; vocals	none to date

=== Former ===
Image	Name	Years active	Instruments	Release contributions
	Adge Cutler	1966–1974 (died 1974)	lead vocals	all Wurzels releases from Scrumpy & Western (1967) to "Little Darlin'" (1972)
	Reg Quantrill	1966–1974 (died 2012)	banjo; guitar; vocals	all Wurzels releases from Scrumpy & Western (1967) to "Little Darlin'" (1972)
	Reg Chant	1966–1967 (died 1978)	accordion; vocals	all Wurzels releases from Scrumpy & Western (1967) to "All Over Mendip" (1967)
	Brian Walker	1966–1967 (died 2020)	tuba; vocals	Scrumpy & Western (1967); Adge Cutler & The Wurzels (1967)
	John Macey	1966–1968 (died 2015)	bass; vocals	all Wurzels releases from Scrumpy & Western (1967) to "All Over Mendip" (1967)
	Henry Davis	1967; 1968	bass; tuba; vocals	"Don't Tell I, Tell 'Ee" (1968); "Up the Clump" (1968); Cutler of the West (1968)
	Melt Kingston	1967–1968 (died 2019)	bass; tuba; vocals	none
	Tony Baylis	1969–1984 (died 2020)	bass; tuba; vocals	all Wurzels releases from Carry On Cutler! (1969) to Freshly Cut (1983)
	John Morgan	1981–2021 (died 2021)	drums; vocals	all Wurzels releases from "The Coughin' Song" (1982) to "Old Rosie" (2017)
	Jai Howe	1984–1986; 2002–2007 (died 2008)	bass; vocals	all Wurzels releases from Never Mind the Bullocks Ere's The Wurzels (2002) to "I Am a Cider Drinker 2007" (2007)
	Terry Pascoe	1984–1986	keyboards; vocals	none
	Mike Gwilliam	1986–1990	bass; vocals	"All Fall Down" (1986); "Sunny Weston-super-Mare" (1988)
	Dave Wintour	1990–2002 (died 2022)	bass; vocals	"Live" Mendip Magic (1992); "I Want to Be an Eddie Stobart Driver" (1995); The Wurzels Live (2002)

=== Stand-in ===
Image	Name	Years active	Instruments	Details
	Pete Shutler	1967 (died 2014)	accordion; vocals	After Reg Chant's departure, Shutler and Scott each performed with The Wurzels prior to Tommy Banner's arrival.
	Ken Scott	1967	accordion; vocals	After Reg Chant's departure, Shutler and Scott each performed with The Wurzels prior to Tommy Banner's arrival.
	Steve Milliner	2017–present	keyboards; vocals	Milliner fills in on keyboards and backing vocals when both Louie Nicastro and Dan Lashbrook are unavailable.

== Lineups ==
Period	Members	Releases
June – July 1966 (as Adge Cutler & The Wurzels)	Adge Cutler – lead vocals; Reg Quantrill – banjo, guitar, vocals; Reg Chant – accordion, vocals; Brian Walker – tuba, vocals	none
Summer 1966 – March 1967 (as Adge Cutler & The Wurzels)	Adge Cutler – lead vocals; Reg Quantrill – banjo, guitar, vocals; Reg Chant – accordion, vocals; Brian Walker – tuba, vocals; John Macey – bass, vocals	Scrumpy & Western (1967); Adge Cutler & The Wurzels (1967)
March – July 1967 (as Adge Cutler & The Wurzels)	Adge Cutler – lead vocals; Reg Quantrill – banjo, guitar, vocals; Reg Chant – accordion, vocals; John Macey – bass, vocals	"I Wish I Was Back on the Farm" (1967); Adge Cutler's Family Album (1967); "All Over Mendip" (1967)
August – October 1967 (as Adge Cutler & The Wurzels)	Adge Cutler – lead vocals; Reg Quantrill – banjo, guitar, vocals; Pete Shutler – accordion, vocals (stand-in); Ken Scott – accordion, vocals (stand-in)	none
October – November 1967 (as Adge Cutler & The Wurzels)	Adge Cutler – lead vocals; Reg Quantrill – banjo, guitar, vocals; Henry Davis – bass, tuba, vocals; Pete Shutler – accordion, vocals (stand-in); Ken Scott – accordion, vocals (stand-in)	none
November 1967 – March 1968 (as Adge Cutler & The Wurzels)	Adge Cutler – lead vocals; Reg Quantrill – banjo, guitar, vocals; Tommy Banner – accordion, piano, vocals; Melt Kingston – bass, tuba, vocals	none
March – late 1968 (as Adge Cutler & The Wurzels)	Adge Cutler – lead vocals; Reg Quantrill – banjo, guitar, vocals; Tommy Banner – accordion, piano, vocals; Henry Davis – bass, tuba, vocals	"Don't Tell I, Tell 'Ee" (1968); "Up the Clump" (1968); Cutler of the West (1968)
January 1969 – early 1974 (as Adge Cutler & The Wurzels)	Adge Cutler – lead vocals; Reg Quantrill – banjo, guitar, vocals; Tommy Banner – accordion, piano, vocals; Tony Baylis – bass, tuba, vocals	Carry On Cutler! (1969); "Poor, Poor Farmer" (1971); "Little Darlin'" (1972)
Early – May 1974 (as Adge Cutler & The Wurzels)	Adge Cutler – lead vocals; Pete Budd – banjo, guitar, vocals; Tommy Banner – accordion, piano, vocals; Tony Baylis – bass, tuba, vocals	none
Summer 1974 – 1981	Pete Budd – lead vocals, banjo, guitar; Tommy Banner – accordion, piano, vocals; Tony Baylis – bass, tuba, vocals	The Wurzels Are Scrumptious! (1975); The Combine Harvester (1976); Golden Delicious (1977); "One for the Bristol City" (1977); Give Me England! (1977); I'll Never Get a Scrumpy Here (1978); "I Hate J.R." (1980); "I Shot J.R." (1980)
1981 – January 1984	Pete Budd – lead vocals, banjo, guitar; Tommy Banner – accordion, piano, vocals; Tony Baylis – bass, tuba, vocals; John Morgan – drums, vocals	"The Coughin' Song" (1982); Freshly Cut (1983)
1984–1986	Pete Budd – lead vocals, banjo, guitar; Tommy Banner – accordion, piano, vocals; Jai Howe – bass, vocals; John Morgan – drums, vocals; Terry Pascoe – keyboards, vocals	none
1986–1990	Pete Budd – lead vocals, banjo, guitar; Tommy Banner – accordion, piano, vocals; Mike Gwilliam – bass, vocals; John Morgan – drums, vocals	"All Fall Down" (1986); "Sunny Weston-super-Mare" (1988)
Late 1990 – late 2002	Pete Budd – lead vocals, banjo, guitar; Tommy Banner – accordion, piano, vocals; Dave Wintour – bass, vocals; John Morgan – drums, vocals	"Live" Mendip Magic (1992); "I Want to Be an Eddie Stobart Driver" (1995); The Wurzels Live (2002)
Late 2002 – late 2005	Pete Budd – lead vocals, banjo, guitar; Tommy Banner – accordion, piano, vocals; Jai Howe – bass, vocals; John Morgan – drums, vocals	Never Mind the Bullocks Ere's The Wurzels (2002); A Taste of the West (2004); "Feed the Wurzels" (2004); "Remember Me/I Am a Cider Drinker" (2005)
November 2005 – February 2007	Pete Budd – lead vocals, banjo, guitar; Tommy Banner – accordion, piano, vocals; Jai Howe – bass, vocals; John Morgan – drums, vocals; Louie Nicastro – keyboards, vocals (part-time)	"Peter Crouch in Lederhosen" (2006); Top of the Crops (2006); "I Am a Cider Drinker 2007" (2007)
February 2007 – late 2017	Pete Budd – lead vocals, banjo, guitar; Tommy Banner – accordion, piano, vocals; Sedge Moore – bass, guitar, vocals; John Morgan – drums, vocals; Louie Nicastro – keyboards, vocals (part-time)	"One for the Bristol City" (2007); "Last Christmas" (2008); A Load More Bullocks (2010); The Wurzels Christmas Album (2011); "The Mendip Windfarm Song" (2014); "Old Rosie" (2017)
Late 2017 – December 2021	Pete Budd – lead vocals, banjo, guitar; Tommy Banner – accordion, piano, vocals; Sedge Moore – bass, guitar, vocals; John Morgan – drums, vocals; Louie Nicastro – keyboards, vocals (part-time); Dan Lashbrook – keyboards, vocals (part-time)	none
December 2021 – present	Pete Budd – lead vocals, banjo, guitar; Tommy Banner – accordion, piano, vocals; Sedge Moore – bass, guitar, vocals; Lee Delamere – drums, vocals; Louie Nicastro – keyboards, vocals (part-time); Dan Lashbrook – keyboards, vocals (part-time)	none to date
