= The Wurzels discography =

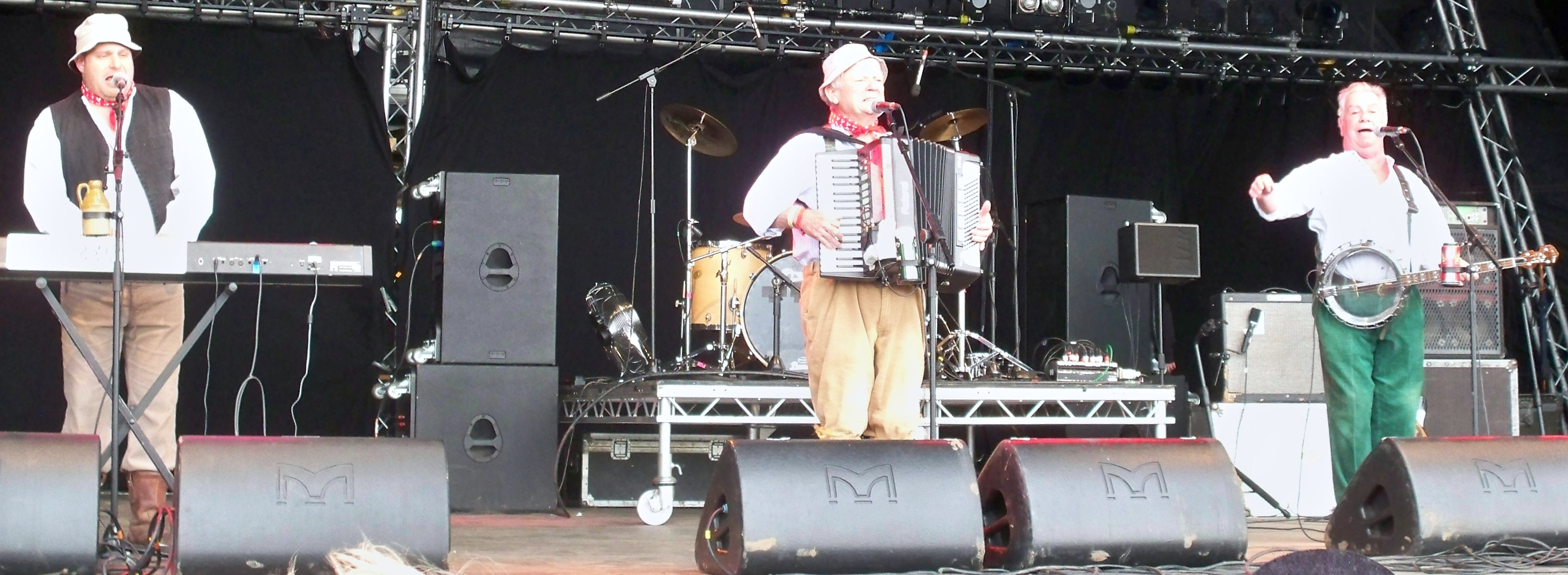
- Studio albums: 9
- EPs: 2
- Live albums: 8
- Compilation albums: 9
- Singles: 42
- Video albums: 1
- Music videos: 7

The Wurzels are a British scrumpy and Western band from Nailsea, Somerset. Since their formation in 1966, the group have released nine studio albums, eight live albums, nine compilation albums, two extended plays (EPs), forty-two singles, one video album and seven music videos. Founded by vocalist Adge Cutler and originally known as "Adge Cutler and The Wurzels", the band debuted in December 1966 with the single "Drink Up thy Cider", which reached number 45 on the UK Singles Chart. The group's first EP and self-titled debut album followed shortly thereafter, the latter of which debuted at number 38 on the UK Albums Chart. After Adge Cutler and The Wurzels, the band released Adge Cutler's Family Album later in 1967, Cutler of the West in 1968 and Carry On Cutler! in 1969 – like their debut, all were recorded live and released on Columbia Records, although none were able to chart. Cutler died in a road traffic accident on 5 May 1974, after which the remaining Wurzels continued the band.

After signing with EMI and releasing The Wurzels Are Scrumptious! in 1975, the band issued their most successful album The Combine Harvester in 1976, which reached number 15 on the UK Albums Chart and was certified silver by the British Phonographic Industry (BPI). Lead single "The Combine Harvester" was also certified silver, having given the Wurzels their first and only UK Singles Chart number one. The Wurzels began issuing primarily studio recordings starting with 1977's Golden Delicious, which was their last release to reach the UK top 40 and receive silver certification. Starting in the 1980s, the group began to self-release their albums, although EMI continued to issue various compilations – one of these releases, The Finest 'Arvest of The Wurzels from 2000, was certified gold by the BPI. A string of singles in the early to mid-2000s charted in the UK, while the band's 2010 album A Load More Bullocks reached number 35 on the UK Independent Albums Chart.

== Albums ==
=== Studio albums ===
List of studio albums, with selected chart positions and certifications
Title	Album details	Peaks		Certifications
Title	Album details	UK	UK Indie	Certifications
Golden Delicious	Released: April 1977; Label: EMI; Formats: LP, cassette, 8-track	32	—	BPI: Silver
Give Me England!	Released: December 1977; Label: EMI; Formats: LP, cassette	—	—	
I'll Never Get a Scrumpy Here	Released: November 1978; Label: EMI; Formats: LP, cassette	—	—	
Freshly Cut	Released: June 1983; Label: Wurzel; Formats: LP, cassette	—	—	
Never Mind the Bullocks Ere's The Wurzels	Released: 18 November 2002; Label: Cruisin'; Format: CD	—	—	
A Taste of the West	Released: 28 June 2004; Label: CIA; Format: CD	—	—	
Top of the Crops	Released: 4 September 2006; Label: CIA; Format: CD	—	—	
A Load More Bullocks	Released: 13 June 2010; Label: CIA; Formats: CD, digital download	—	35	
The Wurzels Christmas Album	Released: 14 November 2011; Label: CIA; Formats: CD, digital download	—	—	
"—" denotes a release that did not register or was not eligible for that chart.

=== Live albums ===
List of live albums, with selected chart positions and certifications
Title	Album details	Peak	Certifications
Title	Album details	UK	Certifications
Adge Cutler & The Wurzels (credited to Adge Cutler & The Wurzels)	Released: 1 March 1967; Label: Columbia; Format: LP	38	
Adge Cutler's Family Album (credited to Adge Cutler & The Wurzels)	Released: October 1967; Label: Columbia; Format: LP	—	
Cutler of the West (credited to Adge Cutler & The Wurzels)	Released: September 1968; Label: Columbia; Format: LP	—	
Carry On Cutler! (credited to Adge Cutler & The Wurzels)	Released: October 1969; Label: Columbia; Format: LP	—	
The Wurzels Are Scrumptious!	Released: July 1975; Label: EMI One-Up; Formats: LP, cassette	—	
The Combine Harvester	Released: July 1976; Label: EMI One-Up; Formats: LP, cassette	15	BPI: Silver
"Live" Mendip Magic	Released: 1992; Label: none (self-released); Format: cassette	—	
The Wurzels Live	Released: 2002; Label: APR Media Centre; Format: CD	—	
"—" denotes a release that did not register on that chart.

=== Compilations ===
List of compilation albums, with selected chart positions and certifications
Title	Album details	Peak	Certifications
Title	Album details	UK Budg.	Certifications
Don't Tell I, Tell 'Ee (credited to Adge Cutler & The Wurzels)	Released: 1972; Label: EMI Starline; Format: LP	—	
The Very Best of Adge Cutler (credited to Adge Cutler & The Wurzels)	Released: 1977; Label: EMI; Formats: LP, cassette	—	
I Am a Cider Drinker	Released: June 1979; Label: EMI Encore; Formats: LP, cassette	—	
Greatest Hits	Released: November 1979; Label: EMI; Formats: LP, cassette	—	
The Wurzels	Released: June 1981; Label: EMI Ideal; Format: cassette	—	
The Wurzels & Adge Cutler & The Wurzels	Released: 1991; Label: EMI Ideal; Format: CD, cassette	—	
The Finest 'Arvest of The Wurzels	Released: 3 July 2000; Label: EMI Gold; Formats: CD, cassette	2	BPI: Gold
The Wurzels Collection	Released: 9 April 2001; Label: EMI; Format: CD	—	
Greatest Hits	Released: 7 May 2007; Label: EMI Gold; Format: CD	—	
"—" denotes a release that did not register or was not eligible for that chart.

== Extended plays ==
List of extended plays
Title	EP details
Scrumpy & Western	Released: February 1967; Label: Columbia; Format: 7" vinyl
Ferry to Glastonbury & Other Places in Somerset...	Released: June 2004; Label: Cruisin'; Format: CD

== Singles ==
List of singles, with selected chart positions and certifications, showing year released and album name
Title	Year	Peak chart positions				Certifications	Album
Title	Year	UK	UK Down.	UK Indie	UK Phys.	Certifications	Album
"Drink Up thy Cider"	1966	45	—	—	—		Adge Cutler & The Wurzels
"The Champion Dung Spreader"	1967	—	—	—	—		Adge Cutler & The Wurzels
"I Wish I Was Back on the Farm"	1967	—	—	—	—		non-album singles
"All Over Mendip"	1967	—	—	—	—		non-album singles
"Don't Tell I, Tell 'Ee"	1968	—	—	—	—		non-album singles
"Up the Clump"	1968	—	—	—	—		non-album singles
"Ferry to Glastonbury"	1969	—	—	—	—		Carry on Cutler!
"Poor, Poor Farmer"	1971	—	—	—	—		non-album singles
"Little Darlin'"	1972	—	—	—	—		non-album singles
"The Combine Harvester"	1976	1	—	—	39	BPI: Silver	The Combine Harvester
"I Am a Cider Drinker"	1976	3	74	6	—		Golden Delicious
"Morning Glory"	1976	—	—	—	—		Golden Delicious
"Farmer Bill's Cowman"	1977	32	—	—	—		Give Me England!
"Give Me England!"	1977	—	—	—	—		Give Me England!
"One for the Bristol City"	1977	—	—	—	—		non-album single
"The Tractor Song"	1978	—	—	—	—		I'll Never Get a Scrumpy Here
"I'll Never Get a Scrumpy Here"	1978	—	—	—	—		I'll Never Get a Scrumpy Here
"You Don't Get Drunk on a Saturday Night"	1980	—	—	—	—		non-album singles
"I Hate J.R."	1980	—	—	—	—		non-album singles
"I Shot J.R."	1980	—	—	—	—		non-album singles
"If You Got Noth'in' on Tonight"	1980	—	—	—	—		non-album singles
"The Coughin' Song"	1982	—	—	—	—		non-album singles
"Wurzel Rap"	1983	—	—	—	—		Freshly Cut
"All Fall Down"	1986	—	—	—	—		non-album singles
"Sunny Weston-super-Mare"	1988	—	—	—	—		non-album singles
"I Want to Be an Eddie Stobart Driver"	1995	93	—	—	93		non-album singles
"Combine Harvester 2001 Remix"	2001	39	—	—	—		non-album singles
"Come On Santa!"	2001	98	—	—	98		Never Mind the Bullocks Ere's The Wurzels
"Don't Look Back in Anger"	2002	59	—	—	26		Never Mind the Bullocks Ere's The Wurzels
"Feed the Wurzels" (with Bush and Troy)	2004	—	—	—	—		non-album singles
"Remember Me/I Am a Cider Drinker" (split with British Sea Power)	2005	—	—	—	—		non-album singles
"Peter Crouch in Lederhosen" (with Bush and Troy)	2006	—	—	—	—		non-album singles
"I Am a Cider Drinker 2007" (with Tony Blackburn)	2007	57	—	—	18		non-album singles
"One for the Bristol City" (re-recording)	2007	66	—	—	26		non-album singles
"Last Christmas" (with Bush and Troy)	2008	—	—	—	—		non-album singles
"Ode to Adge"	2009	—	—	—	—		A Load More Bullocks
"Ruby"	2010	—	—	—	—		A Load More Bullocks
"Sleigh Ride/White Christmas"	2011	—	—	—	—		The Wurzels Christmas Album
"Happy Xmas (War Is Over)"	2013	—	—	—	—		The Wurzels Christmas Album
"The Mendip Windfarm Song"	2014	—	—	—	—		non-album singles
"Old Rosie"	2017	—	—	—	—		non-album singles
"Wurzel Me Up!"	2025	—	—	—	—		non-album singles
"—" denotes a release that did not register or was not eligible for that chart.

== Videos ==
=== Video albums ===
List of video albums
Title	Album details
Live Over Mendip Tonight	Released: 1992; Label: none (self-released); Format: VHS

=== Music videos ===
List of music videos, showing year released and album name
Title	Year	Album
"The Combine Harvester"	1976	The Combine Harvester
"I Am a Cider Drinker"	1976	Golden Delicious
"Don't Look Back in Anger"	2002	Never Mind the Bullocks Ere's The Wurzels
"I Am a Cider Drinker 2007" (with Tony Blackburn)	2007	non-album single
"Ruby"	2010	A Load More Bullocks
"Sleigh Ride"	2011	The Wurzels Christmas Album
"Old Rosie"	2017	non-album single
