= Pete Budd =

English lead singer of The Wurzels

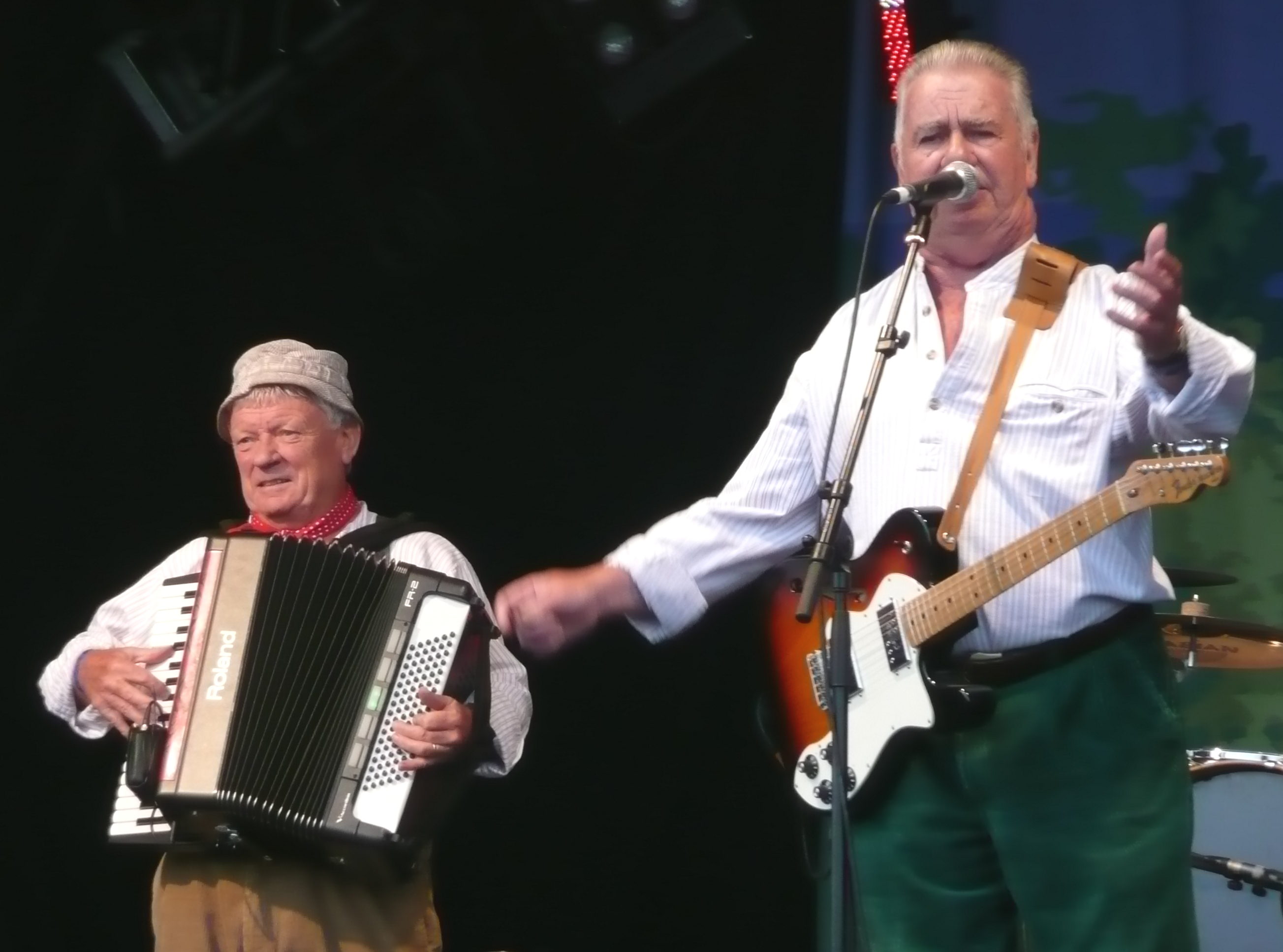
- Budd (right) performing with The Wurzels in 2011

Background information
- Born: Peter Budd; 18 July 1940 (age 85); Brislington, Bristol, England
- Occupations: Singer, guitarist
- Instruments: Vocals; banjo; guitar
- Years active: 1950s–present
- Member of: The Wurzels

Peter Budd (born 18 July 1940) is an English singer who has fronted the Scrumpy and Western band The Wurzels since 1974. He was the vocalist on the number-one hit "The Combine Harvester" and number three hit "I Am a Cider Drinker" in 1976.

== Career ==
In the 1950s, he joined Les Watts and the Rebels. After he started fronting the band, they changed their name to Pete Budd and the Rebels. Budd moved to the group Rainbow People the following decade. During the early 1970s he was part of The Eddie King Band.

=== The Wurzels ===
Budd originally joined the Wurzels as a guitarist and banjo player in 1972. He became the band's singer and frontman following the death of original lead vocalist Adge Cutler in 1974.

In 2015, he and the rest of the Wurzels made a music video to encourage safety of farm workers following a spate of fatal accidents.

== Personal life ==
Peter Budd was born in the Bristol suburb of Brislington. Budd was a carer for his wife, who had Alzheimer's disease, before she died in late 2022.
