= Remember Me/I Am a Cider Drinker =

"Remember Me"/"I Am a Cider Drinker"

Single by Sea Power & The Wurzels
- Released: 17 November 2005
- Genre: Scrumpy and Western, Novelty song
- Length: 7" – 8:05
- Label: Rough Trade Records

Sea Power & The Wurzels singles chronology
"Please Stand Up" (2005)	"Remember Me"/"I Am a Cider Drinker" (2005)	"Waving Flags" (2008)

"Remember Me"/"I Am a Cider Drinker" was a split single released by Sea Power and The Wurzels. The 7" single features The Wurzels covering Sea Power's "Remember Me" and Sea Power covering The Wurzels' 1976 hit "I Am a Cider Drinker". The release was limited to 1,966 (the year Adge Cutler formed The Wurzels) and only available on Sea Power's November 2005 tour or through their official website.

== Track listing ==
=== 7" Vinyl (RTRADS302) ===
1. "Remember Me" (performed by The Wurzels) (Yan/BSP) – 3:01
2. "I Am a Cider Drinker" (performed by British Sea Power) (H. Bouwens) – 5:04

== "I Am a Cider Drinker" ==
"I Am a Cider Drinker" is a cover version of "Paloma Blanca", a song written by Dutch musician George Baker, first recorded and released by his band, the George Baker Selection. The song was a hit throughout Western Europe, reaching No. 1 in Austria, Finland, Flanders, Germany, the Netherlands, Sweden and Switzerland, and it also topped the charts in New Zealand and South Africa. The version of the song created by The Wurzels in 1976, which peaked at number three in the UK Singles Chart, contains a number of references to rural West Country life, referring to scrumpy, rabbit stew, combine harvesters and evenings at the local pub.
