= Scrumpy & Western EP =

- Adge Cutler (seated) with the Wurzels

EP by Adge Cutler & the Wurzels
- Released: 1967
- Recorded: 2 November 1966
- Venues: Royal Oak Inn, Nailsea, England
- Genre: Scrumpy and Western
- Label: Columbia SEG8525
- Producer: Bob Barratt

Scrumpy & Western EP was the second record released by Adge Cutler and The Wurzels, containing the two tracks from their original 1966 hit single, "Drink Up Thy Zider" and "Twice Daily", with two further tracks "Pill, Pill" and "Hark At 'Ee Jacko". The band's first single had reached number 45 in the UK Singles Chart, despite the B-side, "Twice Daily" being banned by the BBC for being too raunchy. The subsequent Scrumpy & Western EP, released the following year, did not achieve a chart placing, however it gave its name to whole new genre of music: Scrumpy and Western. All the tracks were recorded live by Bob Barratt at The Royal Oak Inn, Nailsea, on 2 November 1966.

The front cover of the EP has a photo of Adge Cutler (seated) with the band, against the background of a typical farm building. All are wearing "yokel" outfits, which include corduroy trousers, waistcoats, red kerchiefs and hats. Cutler is holding the ubiquitous "Zider Jar".

== "Drink Up Thy Zider" - Bristol City F.C. and Bath City F.C. ==
Bristol City

Although The Wurzels song "One For The Bristol City" is the official club song for Bristol City F.C., most fans recognise "Drink Up Thy Zider" as their anthem. It is played at the final whistle at Ashton Gate if the home club win, and it is sung by fans along with another Wurzel song, "I am a Cider Drinker".

Bath City

Bath City F.C. supporters are also known for singing "Drink Up Thy Cider" by The Wurzels, a tribute to the Somerset's famous cider brewing industry, with the Wurzels being formed in Somerset and Bath being the county's largest city by population. Like at Ashton Gate, the song is often played at Twerton Park after the home club wins, particularly a big game.

== Scrumpy and Western Genre ==
The Scrumpy and Western genre refers to mainly humorous music from England's West Country that fuses comical folk-style songs, often full of double entendre, with affectionate parodies of more mainstream musical genres, all delivered in the local accent/dialect. Scrumpy is a name given to traditional Somerset cider, and is frequently referred to in The Wurzels' songs.

== See also ==
- List of bands from Bristol
- West Country dialects
- British popular music
