= The Wurzels =

English Scrumpy and Western band

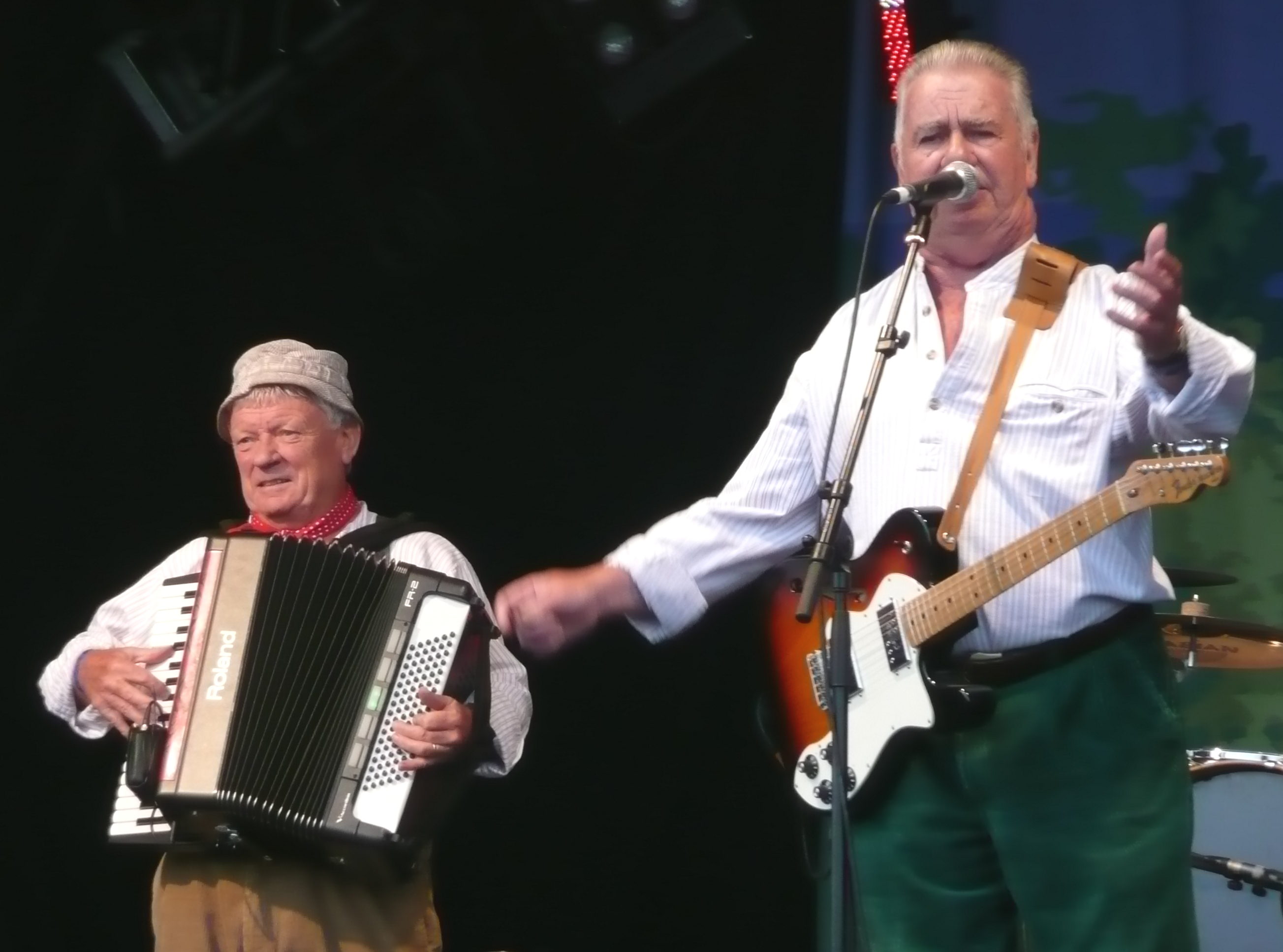
- Banner and Budd performing at the 2011 Wychwood Festival

Background information
- Origin: Nailsea, Somerset, England
- Genre: Scrumpy and Western
- Years active: 1966–present
- Labels: Columbia; EMI; Sony; Cruisin
- Members: Tommy Banner; Pete Budd; Sedge Moore; Louie Nicastro; Joe Tong; Dan Dribble; Dom Chiswell
- Past members: Adge Cutler; John Morgan; Brian Walker; Tony Baylis; Ken Scott; Pete Shuttler; Reg Quantrill; John Macey; Henry Davies; Melt Kingston; Jai Howe; Gary Andrews; Terry Pascoe; Mike Gwilliam; Reg Chant; Dave Wintour
- Website: thewurzels.com

The Wurzels are an English Scrumpy and Western band from the West Country county of Somerset, founded by Adge Cutler and band manager John Miles in 1966 as Adge Cutler & The Wurzels. The band adopted their current name in 1974 after Cutler's tragic fatal car accident.

The Scrumpy and Western genre was created by the band and named after their first album. Their songs are sang in strong Somerset accents and revolve mostly around the theme of farming and rural life in keeping with region's predominantly agricultural character, often doing so in a light-hearted and comedic fashion.

Best known for their 1976 hits UK Number One "The Combine Harvester" and UK Number Three "I Am a Cider Drinker", they have continually performed for nearly 50 years through multiple lineup changes. They, being fans of the club, also wrote Bristol City's anthem.

== Name ==
The name of the band was dreamt up by founder Adge Cutler. It is short for mangelwurzel, a crop grown to feed livestock.

The Wurzels' particular "genre" of music was named Scrumpy and Western after the group's first EP of the same name, issued early in 1967. Scrumpy is a name given to traditionally-made rough cider in southwest England.

== History ==
=== Adge Cutler and The Wurzels ===
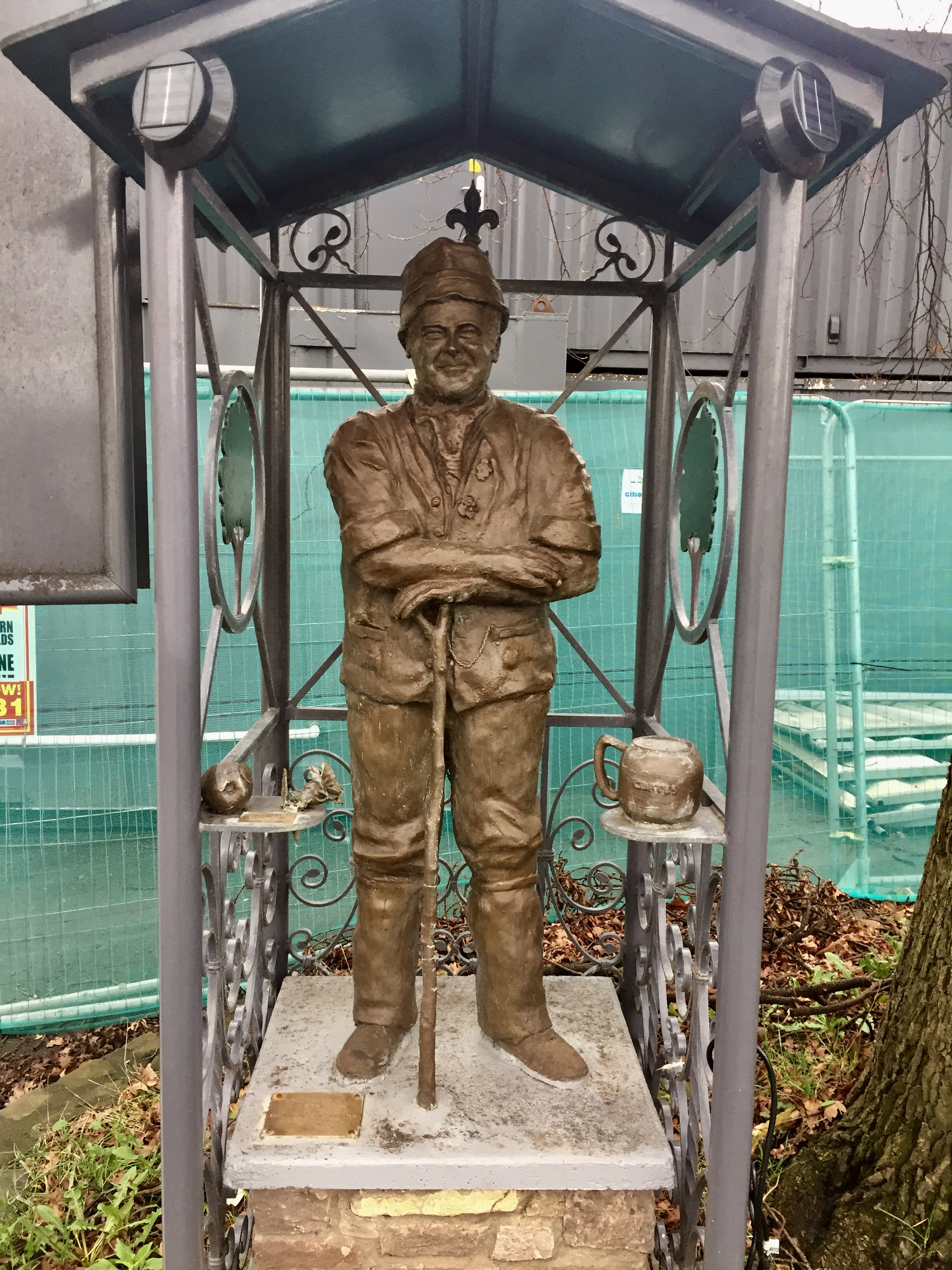
A memorial statue of Adge Cutler stands outside the Royal Oak pub in Nailsea, where the band first recorded.

The Wurzels were formed in 1966 as a backing group for, and by, singer/songwriter Adge Cutler. The first recordings were made live in the Royal Oak Inn, Nailsea, Somerset, in December 1966. With a strong Somerset accent, Cutler played on his West Country roots, singing many folk songs with local themes such as cider-making (and -drinking), farming, dung-spreading, local villages and industrial work songs, often with a comic slant.

During the latter half of the 1960s, the band became popular regionally, and the release of the single "Drink Up Thy Zider" in 1966 led to national fame and it reaching number 45 in the UK Singles Chart. The B-side, "Twice Daily" was banned by the BBC for being too raunchy.

A number of live albums were recorded at local pubs and clubs, filled with Cutler-penned favourites such as "Easton in Gordano", "The Champion Dung Spreader", and "Thee's Got'n Where Thee Cassn't Back'n, Hassn't?", together with songs written by others and some re-workings of popular folk songs of the time.

Adge Cutler died after falling asleep at the wheel of his MGB sports car which then overturned on a roundabout approaching the Severn Bridge. He was returning alone from a Wurzels show in Hereford in May 1974. He was buried in Nailsea.

=== The Wurzels ===
Cutler's death marked a turning point in the history of the Wurzels. Deprived of the main song-writing talent, the remaining Wurzels recorded The Wurzels Are Scrumptious! in 1975, an album containing many favourites from the back catalogue, including a number of previously unrecorded Cutler-written songs. In order to continue the surviving band needed its own songs, and these mostly took the formula of re-written popular pop songs of the time with the lyrics changed to include the usual Wurzel themes (cider, farming, local villages, Cheddar cheese, etc.)

In 1976, the Wurzels released a cover version of "The Combine Harvester", a rework of the song "Brand New Key", by Melanie, which became a UK hit, topping the charts for two weeks, (after Brendan Grace's 1975 reworded version previously hit Irish Number One). The band quickly followed its success with the release of a number of similarly themed songs such as "I Am A Cider Drinker" (a rework of Paloma Blanca which was written by and had been a hit for the George Baker Selection and also covered by Jonathan King the year before) which got to number three in the UK chart, and "Farmer Bill's Cowman" (a reworking of the Whistling Jack Smith instrumental "I Was Kaiser Bill's Batman").

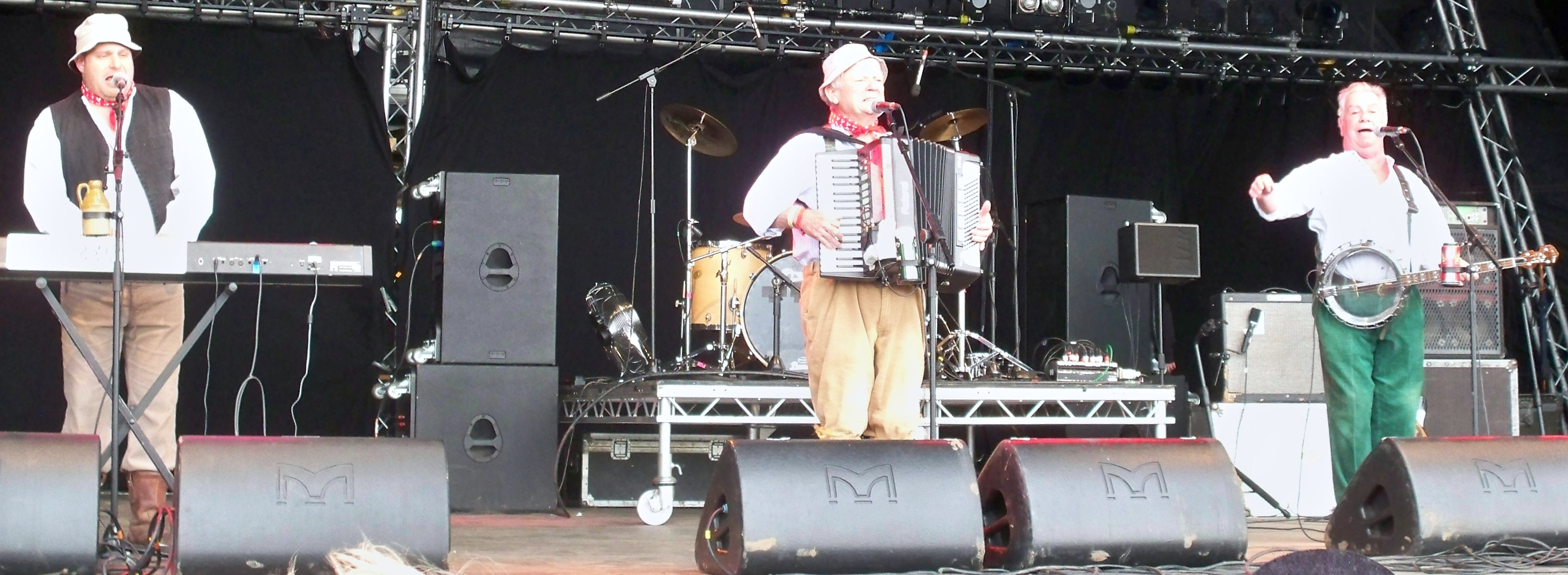
The Wurzels at Guilfest 2012

The Wurzels have never stopped performing, but record releases during the 1980s and 1990s were few — and included singles such as "I Hate JR" and "Sunny Weston-super-Mare". To help celebrate the 25th Anniversary of Eddie Stobart Ltd in 1995, the group signed to Cumbria record label Loose Records & Music, and recorded four new songs including the single "I Wanna Be An Eddie Stobart Driver" (released as a limited edition lorry-shaped disc). The interest in this record sparked off renewed interest in The Wurzels.

The late 1990s saw the continuing of this revival of the fortunes for the surviving Wurzels, gaining a cult status amongst students and a resurgence in their popularity in their native West Country. Under the new management of The Stranglers manager Sil Willcox a number of CD releases followed, largely featuring re-recordings of older works, but also Never Mind The Bullocks, Ere's The Wurzels containing cover versions of contemporary British rock songs. This album was recorded and produced by Louie Nicastro and George Allen. The album title and cover were a spoof of Never Mind the Bollocks, Here's the Sex Pistols.

The Wurzels covered British Sea Power's "Remember Me", while British Sea Power covered The Wurzels' "I Am A Cider Drinker". The band also supported BSP at their gig at the London Forum in November. In 2004, The Wurzels appeared on Never Mind The Buzzcocks in that year's Christmas special, performing Christmas songs to Bill Bailey's team. (Bailey is a Wurzels fan, and stood and saluted upon hearing "Combine Harvester", later claiming that he had the tune on his doorbell at home). In 2005, the band released a limited edition split single with British Sea Power.

In 2007, The Wurzels and Tony Blackburn re-released "I Am A Cider Drinker", with the royalties from the song going to the BUI Prostate Cancer Care Appeal in Bristol.

The Wurzels continue to gig around the UK, including playing at the Shalbourne Festival for nearly 11 years, although they pulled out of the 2007 Glastonbury Festival, having been scheduled to play the bandstand stage where they could not use their own sound engineers, although they had played the same stage at the 2000 Glastonbury Festival. They were also one of the headliners at the 2007 Bristol Community Festival, and made a return to Glastonbury in 2008 (on a higher profile stage).

The Wurzels are also popular with supporters of Bristol City F.C. Their song "One for the Bristol City" is the official club anthem. First released in 1976, a newly recorded version of this song reached number 66 in the UK chart in September 2007. It was previously played at the final whistle at Ashton Gate if the home club won, and it is sung by fans along with other Wurzels songs "I Am A Cider Drinker" and “Drink Up Thy Zider”; the latter of which replaced “One For The Bristol City” as the song played following a win in 2010. The song has also been adopted by Bath City who, like Bristol City, played the track after home victories. The style of the band (Scrumpy and Western) also shared its name with Bristol City's previous mascot, Scrumpy the Robin, and the band regularly perform following final home games of the season.

In addition, the band have become popular among fans of Bristol Bears since their move to Ashton Gate - also regularly playing at the end of a season, and another of their tracks (“The Blackbird”) is sung in the dressing room following every game, should the Bears be victorious.

In December 2009, they released a new single, available by internet download only — a first for the band, entitled "Ode To Adge" - a tribute to the band's founder, Adge Cutler.

In June 2010, the Wurzels' released another single (a cover of the Kaiser Chiefs "Ruby") and as another first in the band's history, issued in preview form, together with a promotional film, on their YouTube channel. The original backing chorus refrain of aah aah aah was replaced by ooarr ooarr ooarr. The single was made available for general release only as an internet download (traditional hardcopies were made available as promo discs to radio stations). The same month the band released the album, A Load More Bullocks - timed to coincide with their appearance the previous Saturday at the Glastonbury Festival. Their session took place on the Avalon stage.

In 2011, BBC Four started a series of repeats of the popular long-running programme Top of The Pops, starting with 1976 and a programme dedicated to that year. Two of the Wurzels, Budd and Banner were interviewed as part of that programme with their first performance on the programme (1976) being screened. In the same month, the BBC's The One Show included an item on the story of the "Combine Harvester" song, featuring further interviews with Budd and Banner and extracts from the 1976 promotional film.

In 2014, they released a new song "The Mendip Windfarm Song" inspired by a local protest about wind turbines being constructed near the Wurzel HQ in Laverton.

In 2015, the Wurzels teamed up with the Farm Safety Foundation with a rewrite of "Combine Harvester", focussing on Farm Safety. The song was accompanied by a light-hearted video produced by students from Moreton Morrell College, drawing attention to the various dangers on the farm.

In February 2016, the band performed at Camden Market in London. The day after, the BBC released never before seen footage of the band from 1967, with Adge Cutler larking around in Bristol City Centre.

Prior to the COVID-19 lockdown in 2020, the Wurzels had played shows two to three times a week for nearly 50 years.

The band were the subject of a Burst Radio celebration, 'The Wurzels: From A to Z', in November 2021.

John Morgan, the bands drummer, contracted COVID-19 and died in hospital, aged 80, in December 2021.

In May 2026 the band released a single, 'Wurzel Me Up!' written by artificial intelligence. Budd commented "We realised that it was a long time since we had written a new pop tune. We needed some 'cutting-hedge' technology" and in response to potential plagiarism concerns; "We don't agree with plagiarism in any form without some form of remuneration and so, in this case, we have strived to only plagiarise ourselves." Despite this, Bristol 24/7 published an opinion piece criticising the single's use of AI, and its use within the wider music industry.

== Members ==
Current members

- Tommy Banner – accordion, piano, vocals (1967–present)
- Pete Budd – lead vocals, banjo, guitar (1974–present)
- Louie "Gribble" Nicastro – keyboards, backing vocals (2005–present, part-time)
- Sedge Moore – bass, guitar, vocals (2007–present)
- Dan "Dribble" Lashbrook – keyboards, backing vocals (2017–present, part-time)
- Dom Chiswell – drums, backing vocals (2023–present)

== Discography ==
Adge Cutler & The Wurzels albums

- Adge Cutler & The Wurzels (1967)
- Adge Cutler's Family Album (1967)
- Cutler of the West (1968)
- Carry On Cutler! (1969)
- Don't Tell I, Tell 'Ee (1972)

The Wurzels albums

- The Wurzels Are Scrumptious! (1975)
- The Combine Harvester (1976)
- Golden Delicious (1977)
- Give Me England! (1977)
- I'll Never Get a Scrumpy Here (1978)
- Freshly Cut (1983)
- Never Mind the Bullocks Ere's The Wurzels (2002)
- A Taste of the West (2004)
- Top of the Crops (2006)
- A Load More Bullocks (2010)
- The Wurzels Christmas Album (2011)

== See also ==
- British popular music
- Scrumpy and Western
- West Country
