= Loose Records & Music =

Loose Records & Music is a British independent record label and publishing company. The label was founded in the mid-1970s by Bernard S. Vick and Andy Titcombe. Originally based in London, United Kingdom, it currently has its headquarters in Cumbria.

== History ==
Loose Records was formed in the mid-seventies in London. It rose from the ashes of Keswick Music, a joint partnership between Bernard S. Vick and Andy Titcombe. Keswick Music had been responsible for the release of the Carlisle United football team record to celebrate their promotion into the First Division of the English Football League. Although this single "Looking Good" achieved good sales, three subsequent releases by different artistes failed to attract enough sales and the partnership was dissolved.

Loose was originally started as a publishing company but developed into a label in the heyday of UK independent labels in the late 1970s. As the label developed it became clear that punk rock and heavy metal were breaking through in a big way and thus, an additional label, Brickyard, was formed to allow Loose to run specialist genres. The label was originally distributed in the UK by Pinnacle Entertainment (UK) one of the large UK independent distributors; in addition, Loose linked with Animus Records in a deal signed at Midem.

The label had its headquarters at 296 Chiswick High Road in West London – sharing the premises with the HQ of independent record store chain Tune In To 269 which was also run by Andy Titcombe. The label had success not only in the UK but internationally as well with artistes like . Demo tapes were regularly received but most artistes were signed because they had close connections to someone working with Loose or else they were customers of the shop. One notable band that failed this simple A&R test was The Housemartins! As a publishing company Loose had success in the disco market in the 1980s as well.

In the late 1980s, Tune In To 269 closed, and the label and the publishing company went into a period of dormancy. In the mid-1990s, the label was relaunched, and a decision was then taken to change direction towards country music. This was followed by the singing of Lemon Grass, The Wurzels and Cattle Company as well as country music writers. Distribution was switched to RCA / BMG, and this immediately led to a top 100 entry in the UK Singles Chart in 1995 for The Wurzels with "I Want To Be An Eddie Stobart Driver". The label continues to concentrate on country music but true to its name, it reserves the right to delve into any genre it fancies.

== Artists ==
The Adults, Richard Anderson, Tim Barker, Anne Barrett, Beat The Drum, Geoff Betsworth, Pete Bite, Cacique, The Cameo, Captain Sensible, Cattle Company, Country Joe MacDonald, Steve Davis, Craig Duggan, John Howard, Michael John, Pat Kerry, Trevor Keyes and Rainbow Country Sounds, Lemon Grass, Lyadrive, The Mangledwurzels, Malcolm Mason, Brian Melville, Brendan Monaghan, Nan Tuck Five, Roland Norris, Olympic Smiles, Brendan O'Hagan, Pump Up, John Richardson, Sangria, The Satellites, Waylander, M. J. Williams, Moon Williams, The Wurzels, Xero.
