= British popular music =

General popular music in the UK

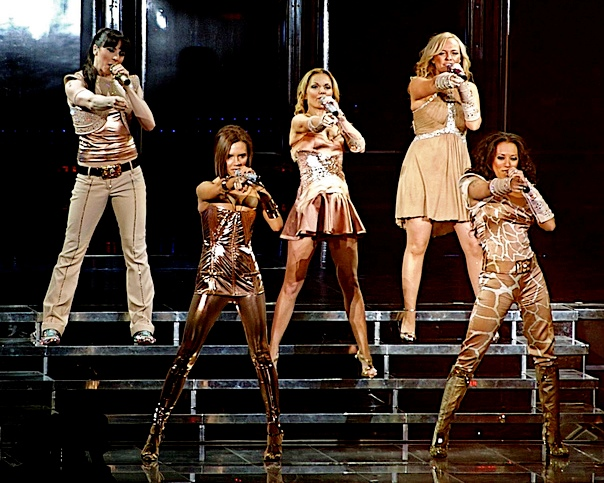
Spice Girls the best-selling female group of all time, one of the best-selling pop groups of all time, and the biggest British pop phenomenon since Beatlemania. Among the highest profile acts in 1990s British popular culture, Time called them "arguably the most recognisable face" of Cool Britannia, the mid-1990s celebration of youth culture in the UK.

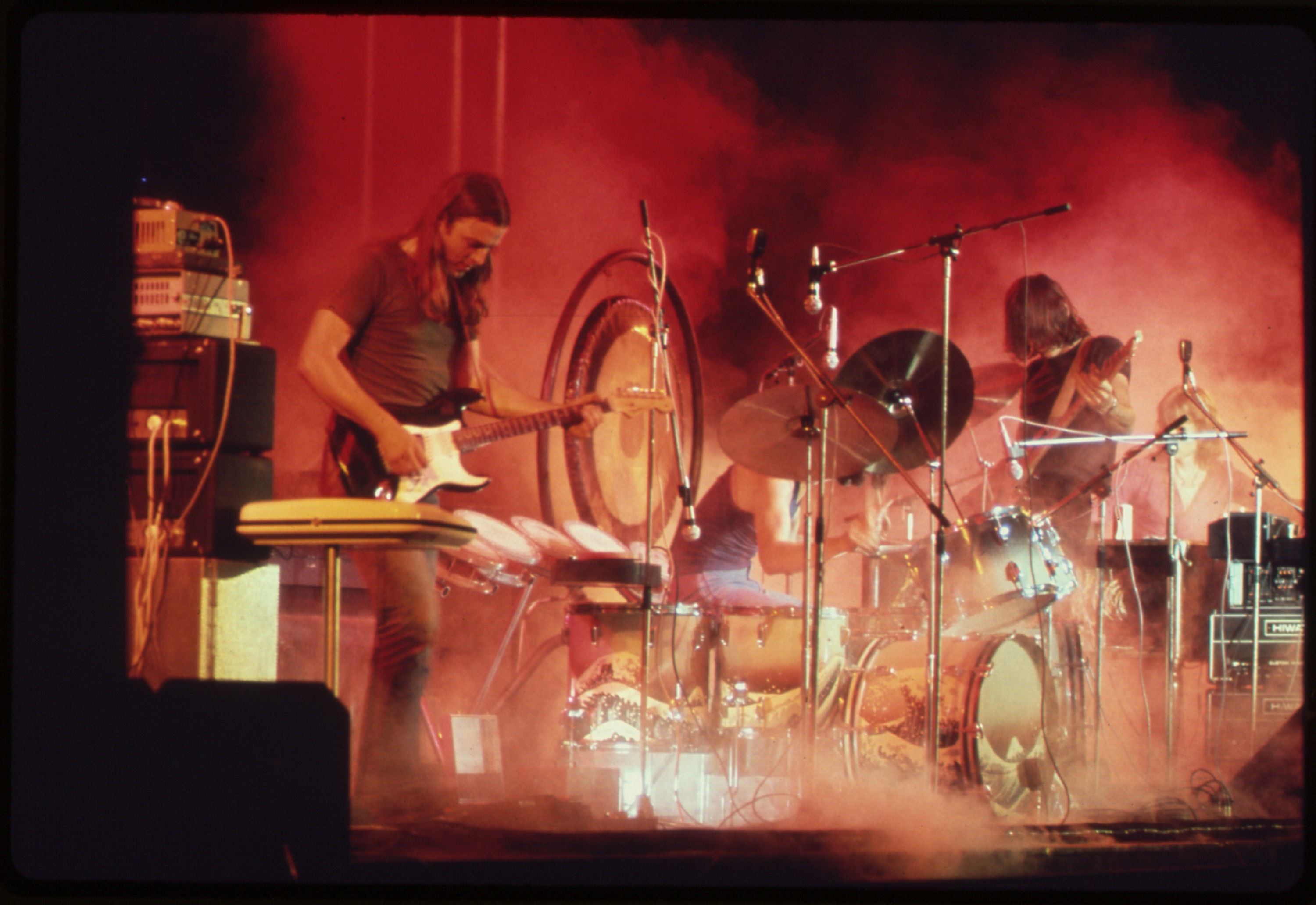
Pink Floyd were a British rock band formed in London. They achieved international acclaim with their progressive and psychedelic music. Distinguished by their use of philosophical lyrics, sonic experimentation, extended compositions, and elaborate live shows, they are one of the most commercially successful and influential groups of popular music history.

British popular music and popular music in general, can be defined in a number of ways, but is used here to describe music which is not part of the art/classical music or Church music traditions, including folk music, jazz, pop and rock music. These forms of music have particularly flourished in Britain, which, it has been argued, has influenced popular music disproportionately to its size, partly due to its linguistic and cultural links with many countries, particularly the former areas of British control such as United States, Canada, and Australia, but also a capacity for invention, innovation and fusion, which has led to the development of, or participation in, many of the major trends in popular music. This is particularly true since the early 1960s when the British Invasion led by The Beatles, helped to secure British performers a major place in development of pop and rock music, which has been revisited at various times, with genres originating in or being radically developed by British musicians, including: blues rock, heavy metal music, progressive rock, punk rock, British folk rock, folk punk, acid jazz, drum and bass, grime, afroswing, dubstep and Britpop.

== Early British popular music ==
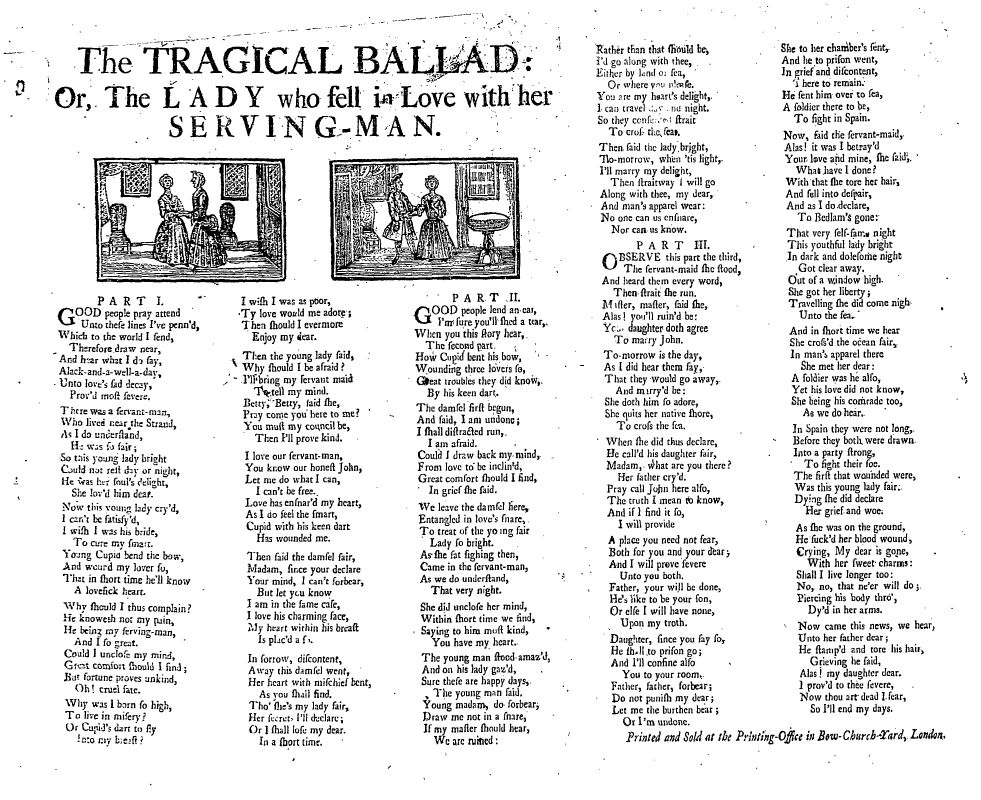
An eighteenth-century broadside ballad

Commercial music enjoyed by the people can be seen to originate in the sixteenth and seventeenth centuries with the arrival of the broadside ballad, which were sold cheaply and in great numbers until the nineteenth century. Further technological, economic and social changes led to new forms of music in the nineteenth century, including the brass band, which produced a popular and communal form of classical music. Similarly, the music hall sprang up to cater for the entertainment of new urban societies, adapting existing forms of music to produce popular songs and acts. In the 1930s the influence of US jazz led to the creation of British dance bands, who provided a social and popular music that began to dominate social occasions and the radio airwaves.

== 1950s ==
By 1950, indigenous forms of British popular music were already giving way to the influence of American forms of music including jazz, swing and traditional pop, mediated through film and records. The significant change of the mid-1950s was the impact of US rock and roll, which provided a new model for performance and recording, based on a youth market. Initially this was dominated by US acts, or re-creations of American forms of music, but soon distinctly British forms began to appear, first in the uniquely British take on US folk music in the Skiffle craze of the 1950s, in the beginnings of a folk revival that came to place an emphasis on national traditions and then in early attempts to produce British rock and roll. However it's important to note that American folk music itself has its root in British and Irish folk music, and so was seen as more of a shared cultural tradition than a new form of music. Indeed, many of the later American genres such as Blues and Rock & Roll share origins with earlier Folk and popular music that merged with predominantly African American forms of music to create what would become the aforementioned genres. A key feature in much American music being the Scotch Snap for example. This evidences a common theme of cyclical exportation and re-exportation of British and American music between the respective cultures.

== 1960s ==
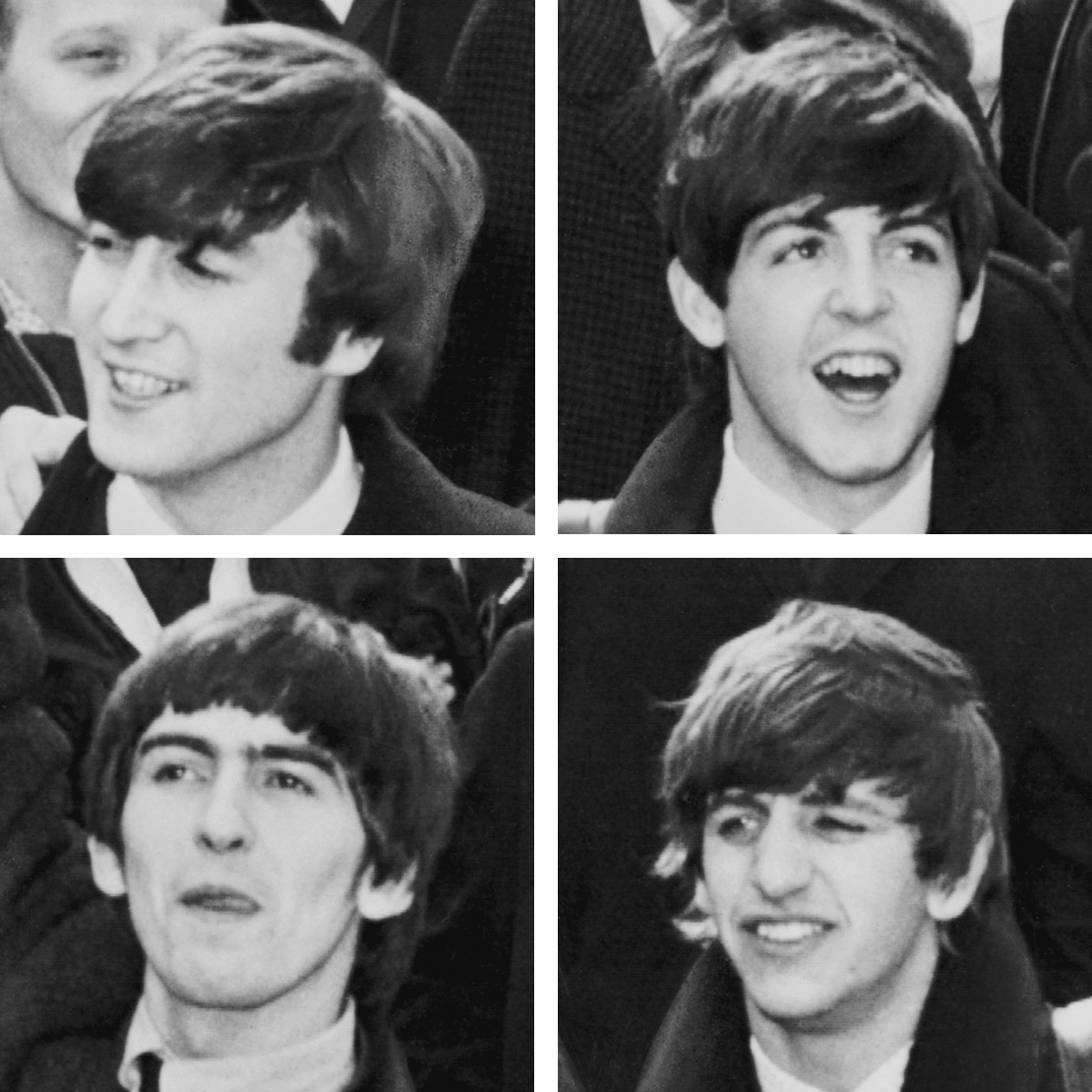
The Beatles

By the early 1960s the British had developed a viable national music industry and began to produce adapted forms of American music in beat music and British blues which would be re-exported to America by bands such as The Beatles and Rolling Stones. This helped to make the dominant forms of popular music something of a shared Anglo-American project. The development of British blues rock helped revitalised rock music and led to the growing distinction between pop and rock music. In the mid-1960s, British bands were at the forefront in the creation of the hard rock genre. While pop music continued to dominate the singles charts, teen culture continued to dominate. Rock began to develop into diverse and creative subgenres that characterised the form throughout the rest of the twentieth century.

== 1970s ==
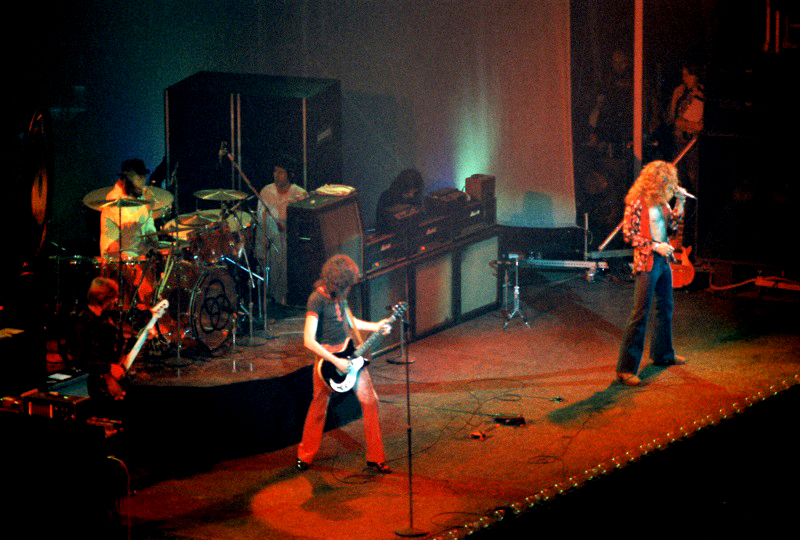
Led Zeppelin performing in 1975

In the 1970s, British musicians played a major part in developing the new forms of music that had emerged from blues rock towards the end of the 1960s, including folk rock and psychedelic rock. Several important and influential subgenres were created in Britain in this period, by pursuing the possibilities of rock music, including British folk rock and glam rock, a process that reached its apogee in the development of progressive rock and one of the most enduring subgenres in heavy metal music. While jazz began to suffer a decline in popularity in this period, Britain began to be increasingly influenced by aspects of world music, including Jamaican music, resulting in new music scenes and subgenres. In the middle years of the decade, the influence of pub rock led to the British intensification of punk, which swept away much of the existing landscape of popular music, replacing it with much more diverse new wave and post-punk bands who mixed different forms of music and influences to dominate rock and pop music into the 1980s.

== 1980s ==
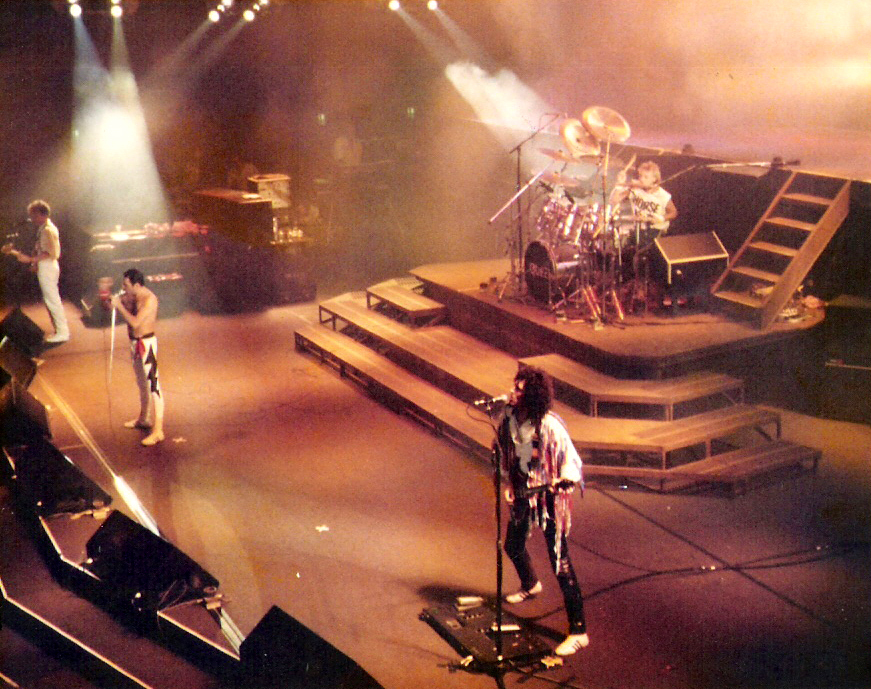
Queen in concert, 1984

Rock and pop music in the 1980s built on the post-punk and new wave movements, incorporating different sources of inspiration from subgenres and what is now classed as world music in the shape of Jamaican and Indian music, as did British jazz, as a series of black British musicians came to prominence, creating new fusions like acid jazz. It also explored the consequences of new technology and social change in the electronic music of synth-pop.

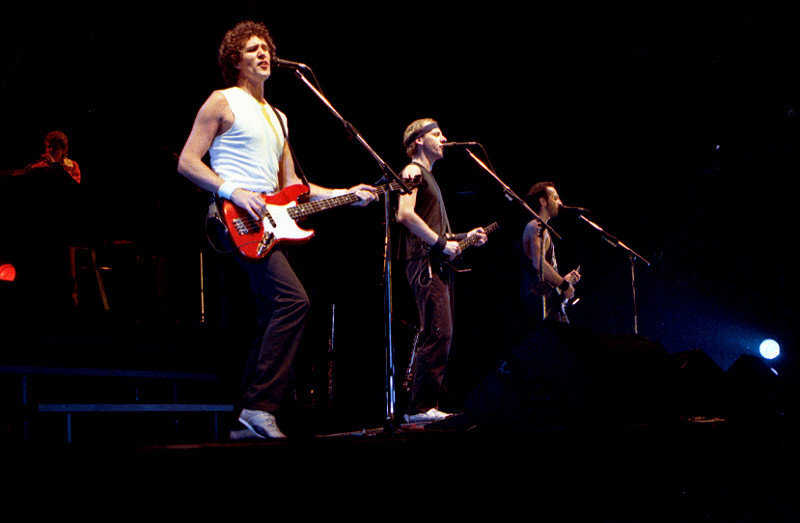
Dire Straits in 1985.

In the early years of the decade, subgenres like heavy metal music continued to develop separately, especially influenced by NWOBHM leaders Iron Maiden, among others. There was a considerable crossover between rock and more commercial popular music, with a large number of more "serious" bands, like the Police and UB40, enjoying considerable single chart success. The advent of MTV and cable video helped spur what has been seen as a Second British Invasion in the early years of the decade, with British bands enjoying more success in America than they had since the height of the Beatles' popularity in the 1960s. However, by the end of the decade there was a fragmentation, with many new forms of music and sub-cultures, including hip hop and house music, while the single charts were once again dominated by pop artists, now often associated with the hi-NRG hit factory of Stock Aitken Waterman. The rise of the indie rock scene was partly a response to this, and marked a shift away from the major music labels and towards the importance of local scenes like Madchester and subgenres like gothic rock.

== 1990s ==
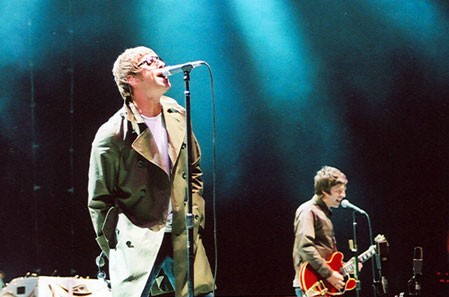
Gallagher brothers of Oasis on stage

In the 1990s, while the singles charts were dominated by boy bands and girl groups like Take That and Spice Girls, British soul and Indian-based music also enjoyed their greatest level of mainstream success to date, and the rise of World music helped revitalise the popularity of folk music. Electronic rock bands like The Prodigy and Chemical Brothers began to achieve a high profile. Alternative rock reached the mainstream, emerging from the Madchester scene to produce dream pop, shoegazing, post rock and indie pop, which led to the commercial success of Britpop bands like Blur and Oasis; followed by a stream of post-Britpop bands like Travis and Feeder, which led the way for the international success of bands including Snow Patrol and Coldplay.

== 2000s ==
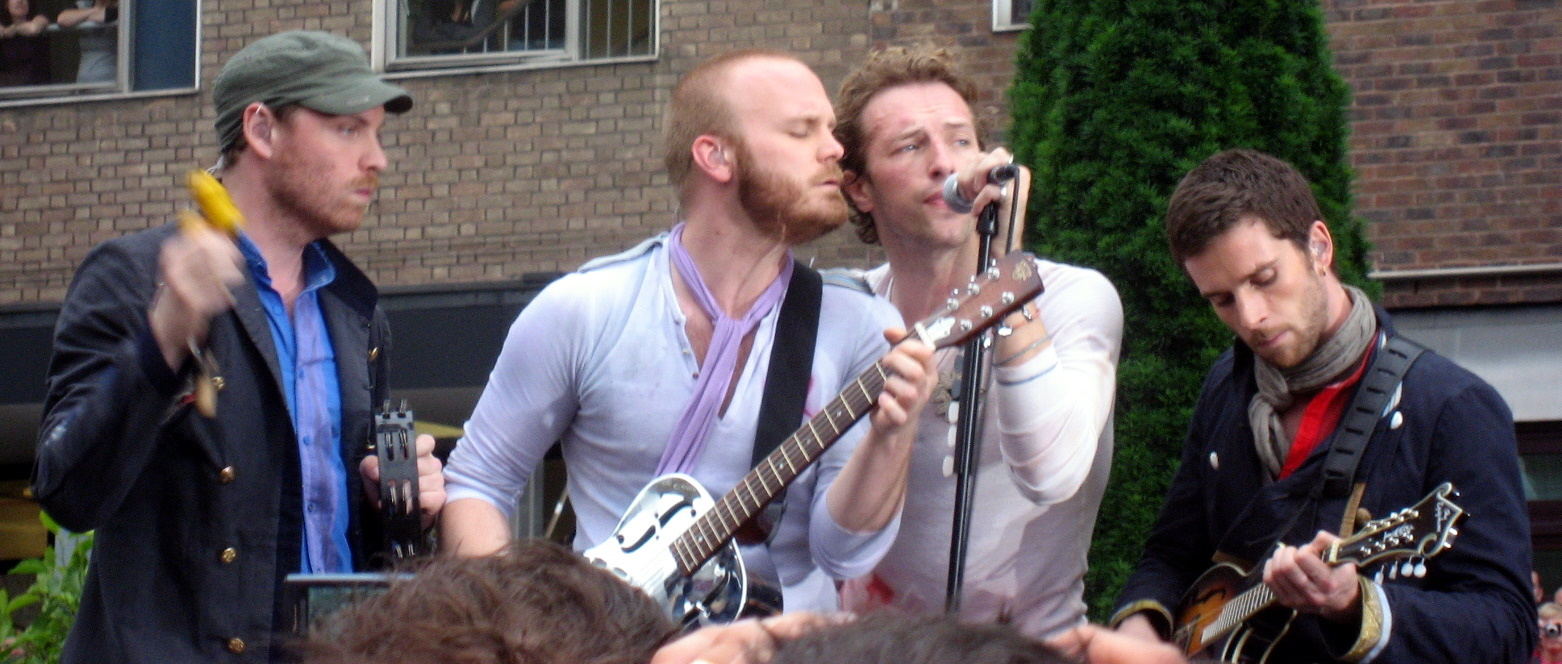
Coldplay, considered to be the most successful band of the 21st century.

At the beginning of the new millennium, while talent show contestants were one of the major forces in pop music, British soul maintained and even extended its high-profile with figures like Joss Stone, Amy Winehouse and Adele, while a new group of singer/songwriters, including KT Tunstall and James Blunt, achieved international success and to rock bands such as Arctic Monkeys, Coldplay and Bring Me the Horizon. New forms of dance music emerged, fusing hip hop with garage to form grime. There was also a revival of garage rock and post punk, which when mixed with electronic music produced new rave.

== 2010s ==
The success of UK artists in the US during the early 2010s led to some claiming a new British Invasion was taking place, as British musicians took their largest ever share of the US album charts year-on-year between 2011 (11.7% of US market), 2012 (13.7% of US market), 2013 and 2014. Notable British musicians achieving global success at the beginning of the 2010s include Dua Lipa, One Direction, Little Mix, Cher Lloyd, Rita Ora, Adele and Mumford & Sons.

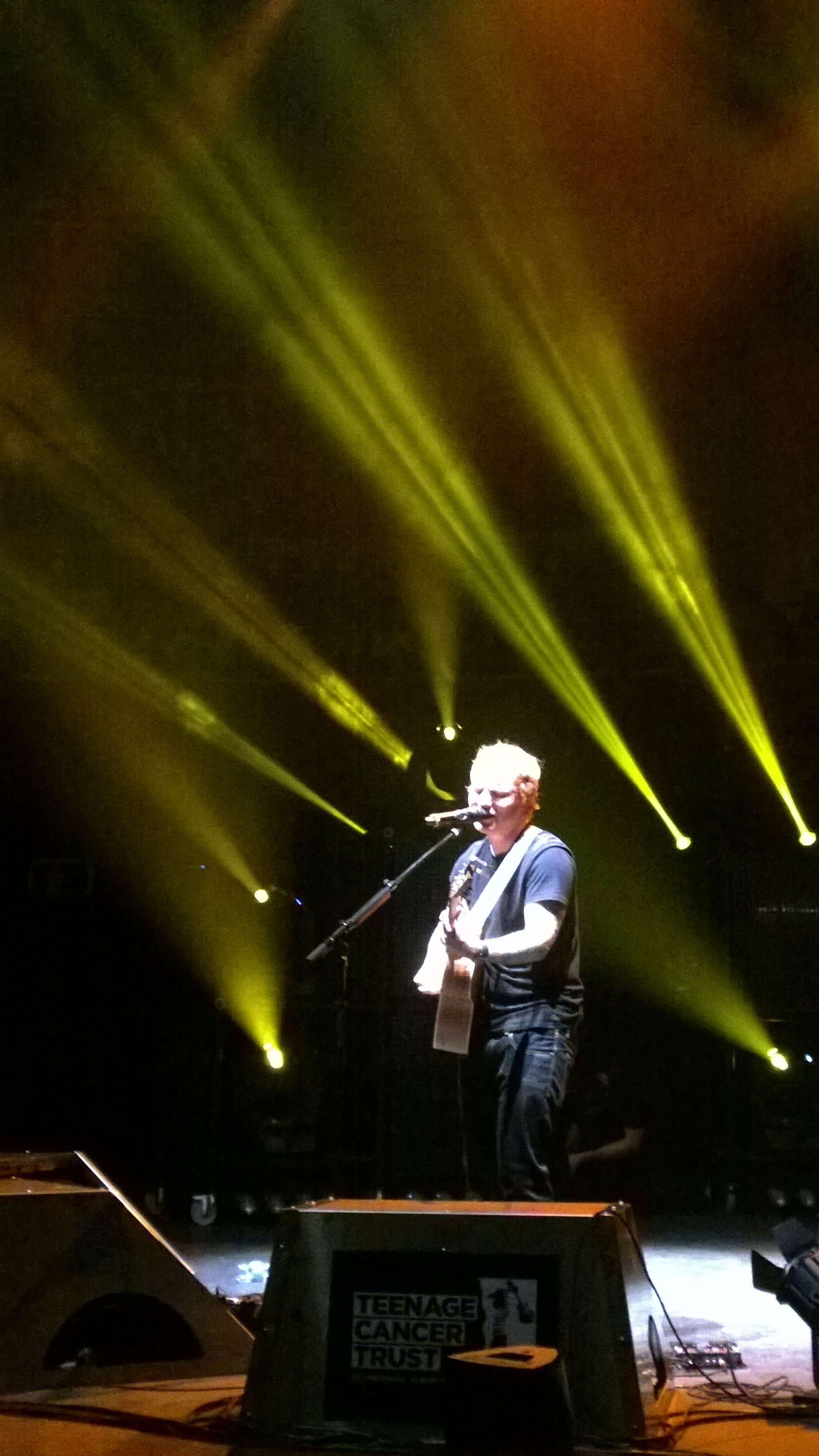
Ed Sheeran performing at the Royal Albert Hall in London, March 2014

Adele's album 21 sold over 6 million copies and became the UK's best-selling album of the 21st century and its fourth best-selling album of all time, certified platinum 16 times. During the same year, Back to Black by Amy Winehouse became the UK's second best selling album of the 21st century and its 13th best-selling album of all time following her death in 2011, certified platinum 11 times.

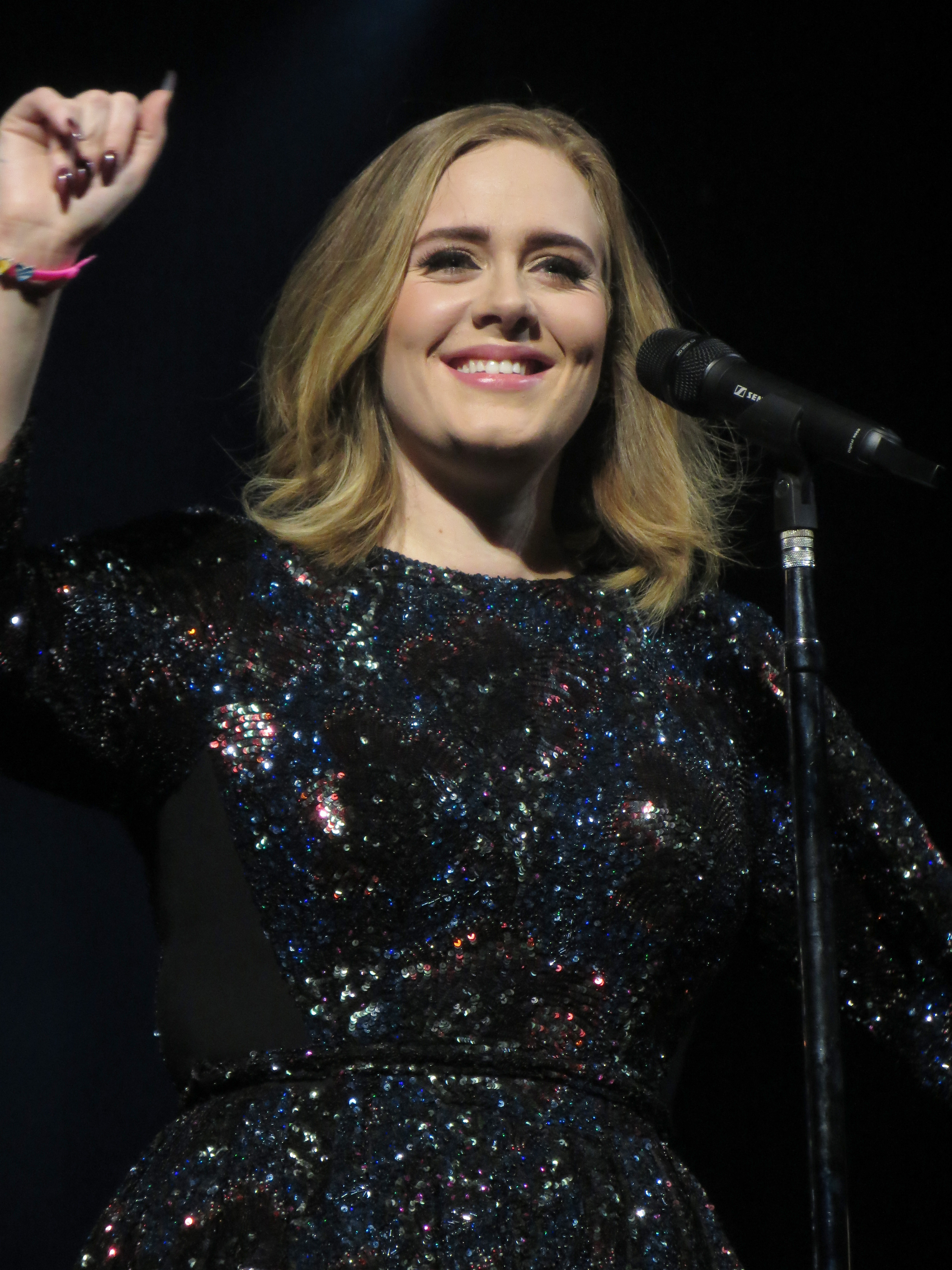
Adele performing in Glasgow, 2016.

In 2013, despite the trend of declining album sales persisting, the British music industry saw a 9% growth in revenue which could be traced to "individual revenues by musicians, singers, composers, songwriters and lyricists", adding £3.8bn to the UK economy. In 2014, the UK's top 10 albums were all by British artists, including releases by Ed Sheeran, Sam Smith, George Ezra, Paolo Nutini, Coldplay and One Direction.

Sam Smith's debut album In the Lonely Hour, released in 2014, peaked at number one in the United Kingdom, New Zealand and Sweden, and number two in Australia, Canada, Denmark, Ireland, Norway and the United States. In the same year, Ed Sheeran's second album x charted at number one in twelve countries, topping both the UK Albums Chart and the US Billboard 200, and reaching the top 5 in eleven other countries. Also in 2014, One Direction's album Four reached number 1 in the UK, became the top charted album on iTunes in 67 countries and debuted at No. 1 on the Billboard 200 chart in the US. As a consequence, One Direction became the first band to reach number one on the US Billboard chart with each of their first four albums, British or otherwise. Adele's 25 released in 2015 has gone on to sell over 3.5 million copies and broke records immediately after its release in the UK. Adele's success was noted for reviving the music industry and saving the dwindling sales worldwide.

== See also ==
- List of number-one singles (UK)
- British pop music
- British rock
