= Paloma Blanca =

1975 single by George Baker Selection

Single by George Baker Selection

from the album Paloma Blanca
- B-side: "Dreamboat"
- Released: 1975
- Length: 3:27
- Label: Negram; Warner Bros.
- Songwriter: Johannes Bouwens
- Producer: Johannes Bouwens

George Baker Selection singles chronology
"Sing a Song of Love" (1974)	"Paloma Blanca" (1975)	"Morning Sky" (1975)

Performance video
- "Paloma Blanca" on Top Pop on YouTube

"Paloma Blanca" (Spanish for "white dove"), often called "Una Paloma Blanca", is a song written by Dutch musician George Baker (under his real name, Johannes Bouwens) and first recorded and released by his band, George Baker Selection. The single—the title track of the group's fifth album—was released in 1975 with "Dreamboat" (or "Dream Boat") as its B-side. The song was a hit throughout Europe, reaching No. 1 in Austria, Finland, Flanders, the Netherlands, Sweden, Switzerland and West Germany, and it also topped the charts of New Zealand and South Africa.

In the United States, the song became a No. 1 hit on the Billboard Easy Listening Singles chart on 14 February 1976 (becoming that chart's overall No. 1 song for 1976), peaked at No. 26 on the Billboard Hot 100, and reached No. 33 on the Billboard Hot Country Singles chart. In Canada and the United Kingdom, "Paloma Blanca" peaked at No. 10, and in Australia, it reached No. 2. The song sold over two million copies worldwide.

== Meaning ==
Baker has been quoted as saying the song is about "a poor South American farmer who works hard all day and then sits by a tree and dreams of being a white bird with its freedom."

== Charts ==
=== Weekly charts ===
Chart (1975–1976)	Peak position
Australia (Kent Music Report)	2
Austria (Ö3 Austria Top 40)	1
Belgium (Ultratop 50 Flanders)	1
Belgium (Ultratop 50 Wallonia)	6
Canada Top Singles (RPM)	10
Canada Adult Contemporary (RPM)	1
Canada Country Singles (RPM)	36
Denmark (IFPI)	15
Finland (Suomen virallinen lista)	1
Italy (Germano Ruscitto)	10
Netherlands (Dutch Top 40)	1
Netherlands (Single Top 100)	1
New Zealand (Recorded Music NZ)	1
Norway (VG-lista)	1
South Africa (Springbok Radio)	1
Spain (El Gran Musical)	2
Sweden (Sverigetopplistan)	1
Switzerland (Schweizer Hitparade)	1
UK Singles (Official Charts)	10
US Billboard Hot 100	26
US Easy Listening (Billboard)	1
US Hot Country Singles (Billboard)	33
US Cash Box Top 100	22
West Germany (GfK)	1

=== Year-end charts ===
Chart (1975)	Rank
Australia (Kent Music Report)	11
Austria (Ö3 Austria Top 40)	2
Belgium (Ultratop 50 Flanders)	1
Netherlands (Dutch Top 40)	1
Netherlands (Single Top 100)	1
New Zealand (RIANZ)	4
South Africa (Springbok Radio)	6
Switzerland (Schweizer Hitparade)	2
West Germany (Media Control)	1

Chart (1976)	Rank
Australia (Kent Music Report)	94
Canada Top Singles (RPM)	110
US Easy Listening (Billboard)	1
US (Joel Whitburn's Pop Annual)	157

== Cover versions ==
Following the George Baker Selection's success, the song was widely covered. In the UK, where the group took "Paloma Blanca" to a number 10 chart peak, the recording by Jonathan King reached number five.

In 1976, English Scrumpy and Western band the Wurzels released a cover version titled "I Am a Cider Drinker" that contains a number of references to rural West Country life, including scrumpy, rabbit stew, combine harvesters and evenings at the local pub. The single was a number-three hit on the UK singles chart. A remastered version was produced in 2007, with an accompanying video which featured veteran disk jockey Tony Blackburn.

== See also ==
- List of number-one hits of 1975 (Germany)
- List of number-one singles (Sweden)
- List of number-one adult contemporary singles of 1976 (U.S.)
