= List of UK singles chart number ones =

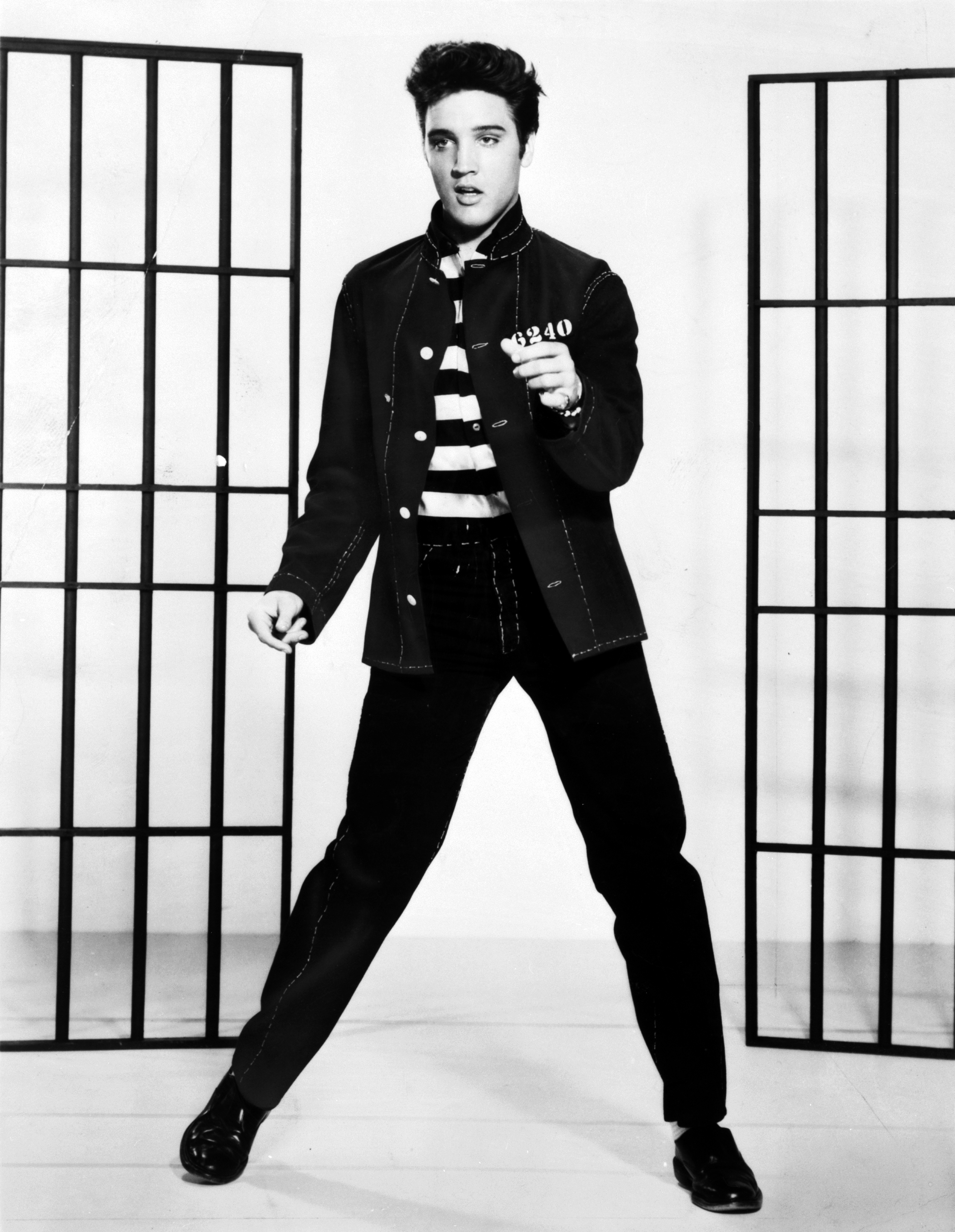
Elvis Presley has achieved 21 number ones on the UK singles chart, more than any other act.

The UK singles chart is a weekly record chart which for most of its history was based on single sales from Sunday to Saturday in the United Kingdom. Since July 2014 it has also incorporated streaming data, and from 10 July 2015 has been based on a Friday to Thursday week. As of 14 February 2026, 1,451 singles have reached number one. The chart was founded in 1952 by Percy Dickins of New Musical Express (NME), who telephoned 20 record stores to ask what their top 10 highest-selling singles were. Dickins aggregated the results into a top 12 hit parade, which was topped by "Here in My Heart" by Al Martino. NME's chart was published each week in its eponymous magazine.

The sources, in accordance with the official canon of the Official Charts Company, are the New Musical Express chart from 1952 to 1960; the Record Retailer chart from 1960 to 1969; and the Official UK Singles Chart from 1969 onwards.

== Turnover of number ones ==
The calendar year that has featured the most UK number ones is 2000, with 42; the year with the fewest number ones is 2016, with 10. 1952 had only one number one, although the chart started in November.

The act that has achieved the most number ones is American entertainer Elvis Presley, who has topped the chart 21 times (including 3 re-releases of songs that had previously been number ones) – Presley's second number one, "Jailhouse Rock", was the first single ever to debut at the top of the chart. The most successful band (and equal with Elvis based on unique songs) are The Beatles, who have achieved 18 number ones. The Beatles' first chart-topper, "From Me to You", reached number one in May 1963, and their last in November 2023 – the longest span of number ones for any artist.

In the 1970s, the required number of sales needed to top the chart was roughly 150,000. During 1992, when few releases were reaching number one, sales of CD singles were low: songs needed to sell only 60–70,000 each week to remain at the top. In 2000, when turnover of number ones was high, tracks could often sell between 100,000 and 200,000 copies in a single week. UK chart commentator James Masterton remarked in 2003: "When record sales are high, public interest in a song expires very quickly and this creates a need for ever more new product to take its place." Sales figures improved in 2008 and continued into the early 2010s, peaking in 2013, before declining over the next few years as audio streaming became popular. Eventually, streaming was incorporated into the sales chart.

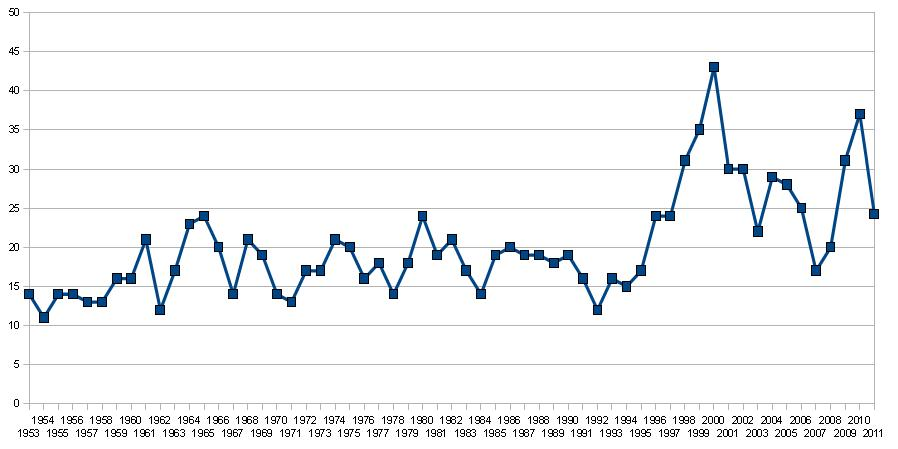
Graph showing number of UK number-one singles for each year since 1953. The 2011 figure is projected.

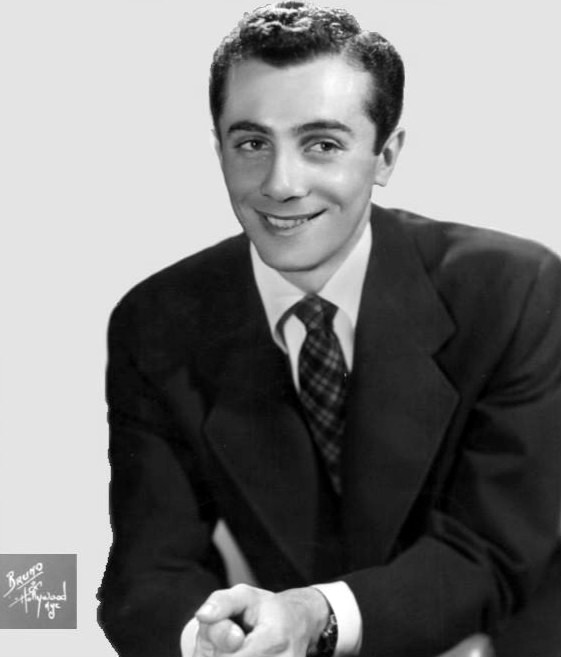
Al Martino's track "Here in My Heart" was the first single ever to top the UK Singles Chart, and the only single to reach number one during 1952.

== Number ones in each year ==
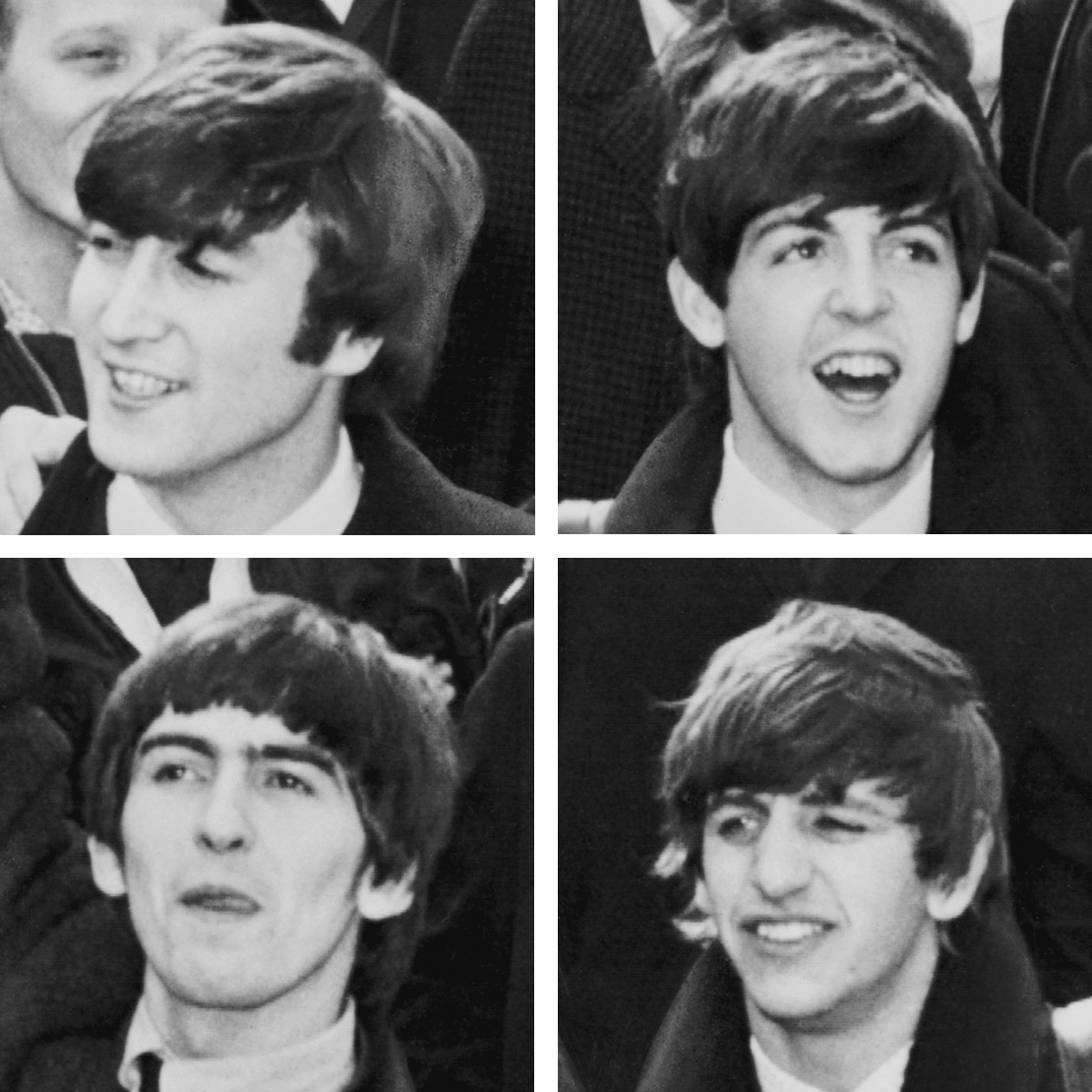
The Beatles topped the chart 17 times during the 1960s, more than any other act that decade.

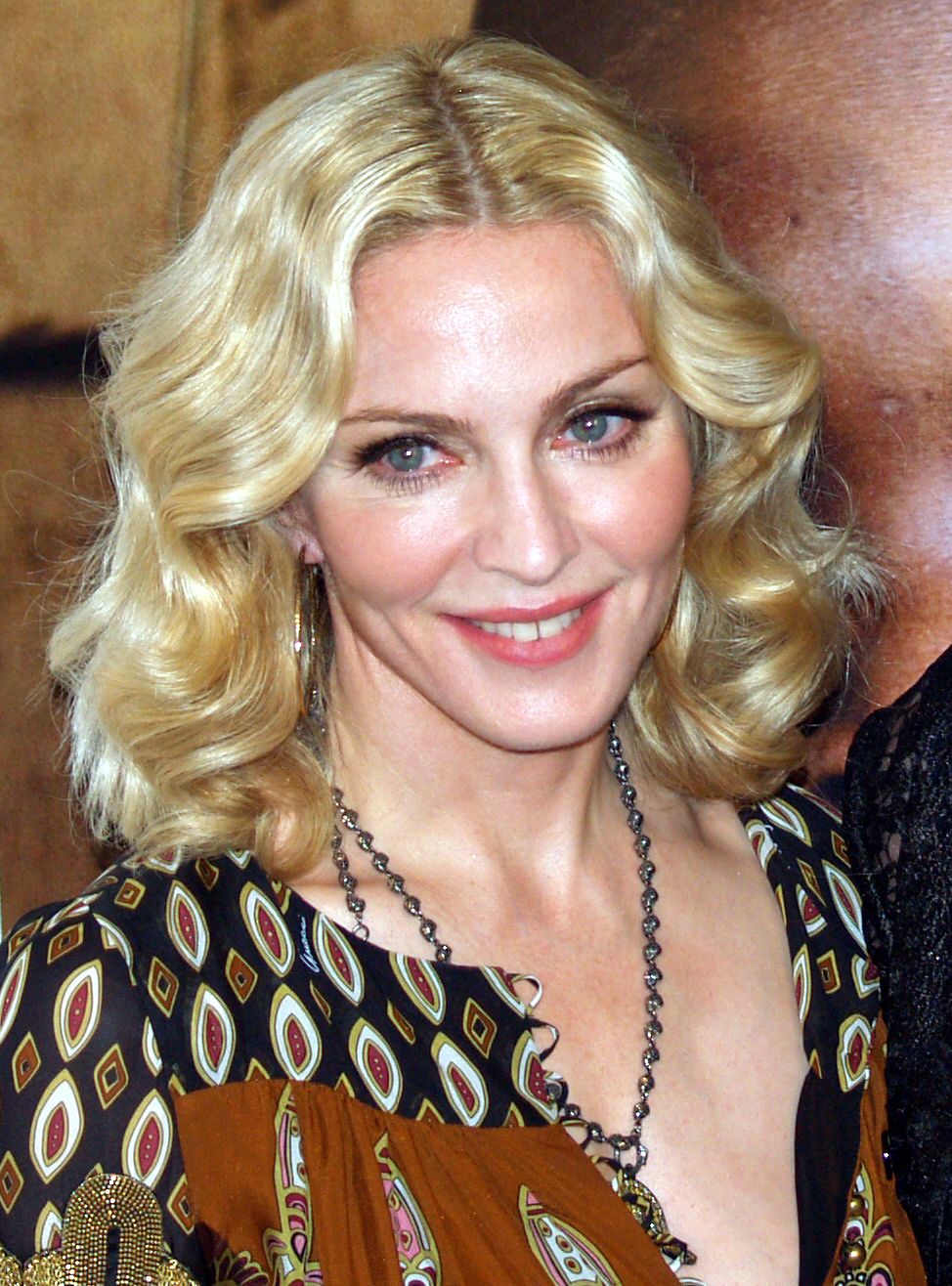
Madonna is the most successful female solo artist in the UK, having achieved 13 number-one singles.

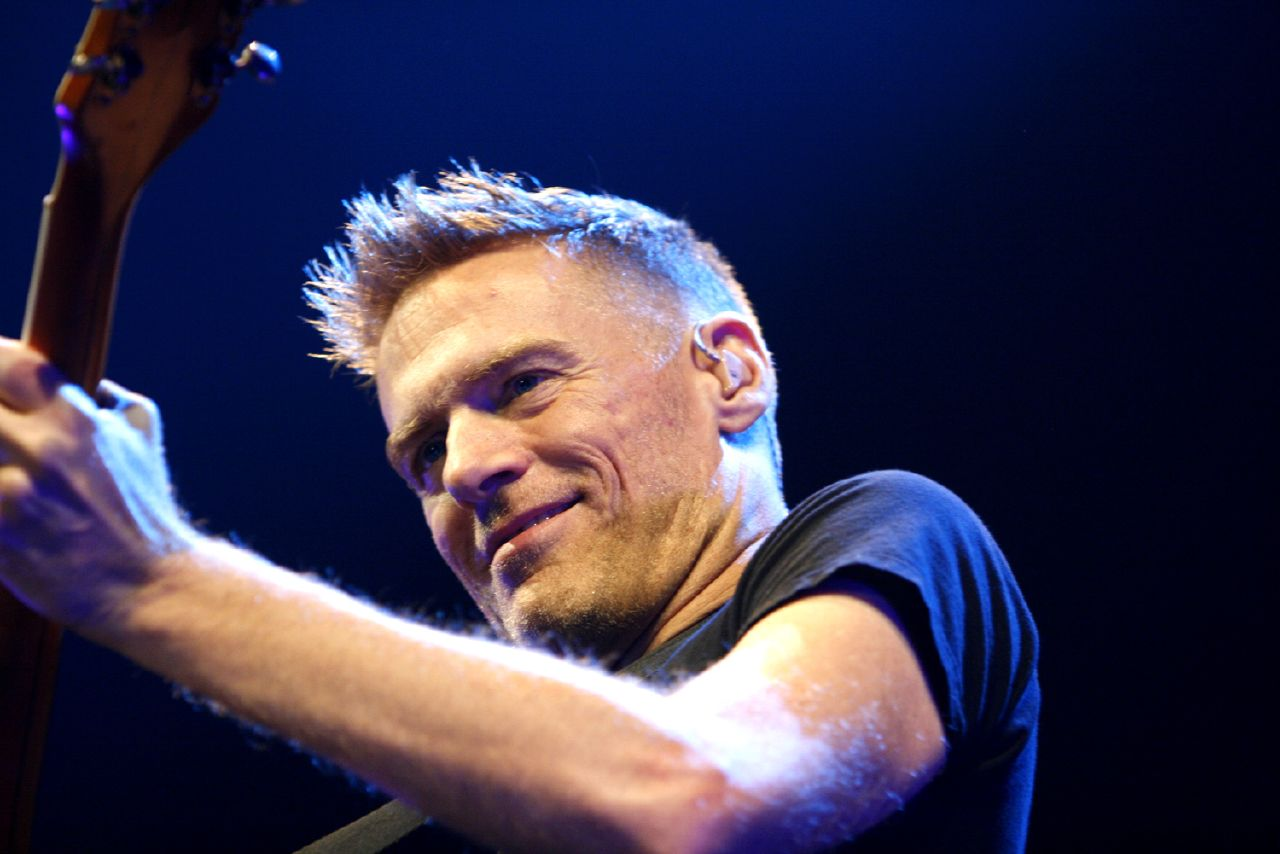
Bryan Adams' first number one, "(Everything I Do) I Do It for You", spent 16 consecutive weeks at number one, longer than any other track.

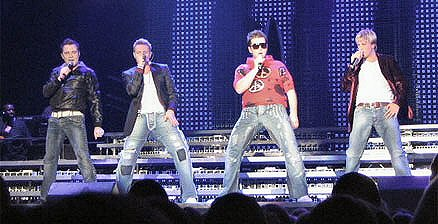
Westlife were the most successful band of the 2000s, with 11 number-one singles in that decade and 14 overall.

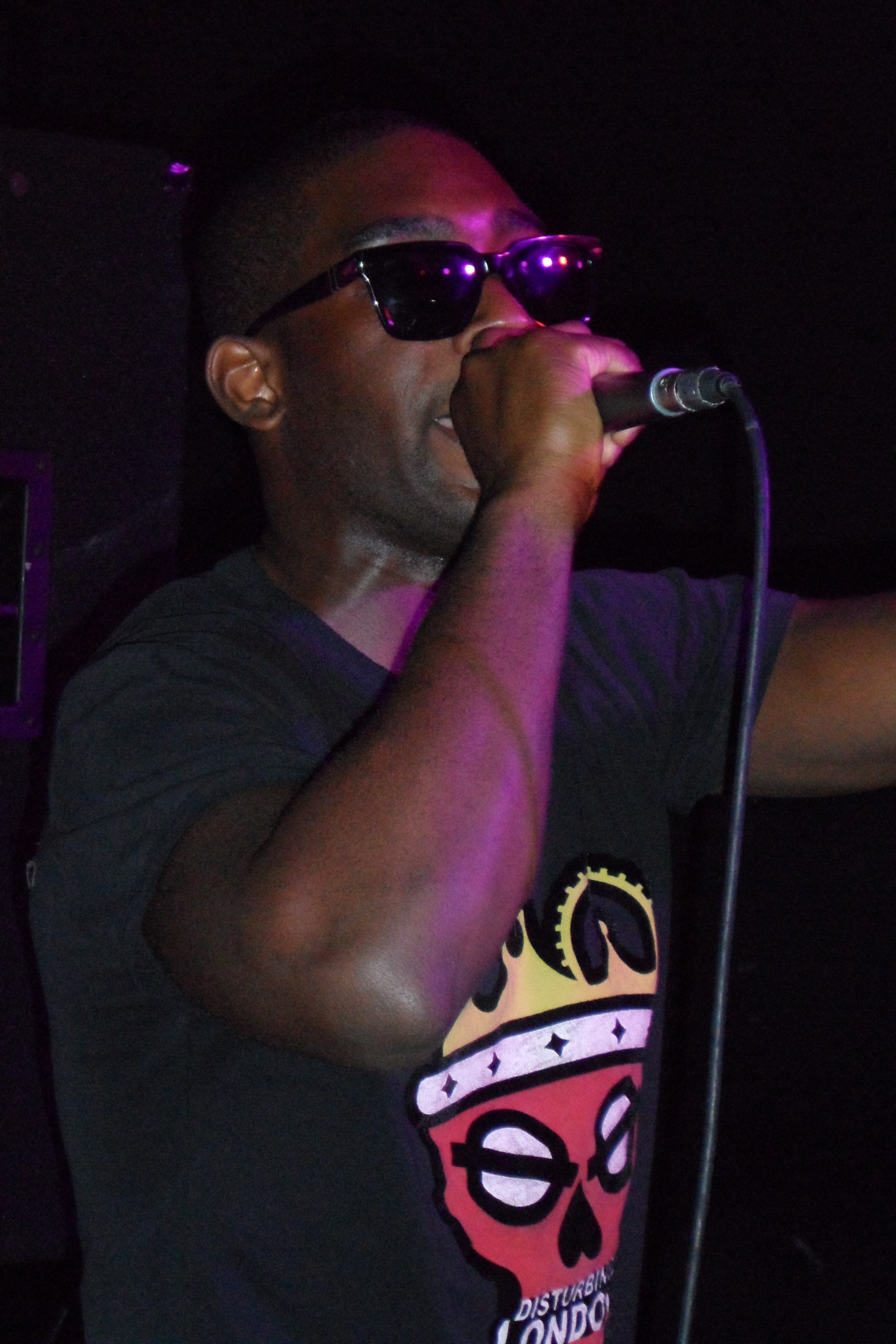
Tinie Tempah had seven UK number-one singles in the 2010s.

Key
†	Most number ones of the decade
‡	Most number ones of all time

Year	Number-one singles	Ref.
1950s
1952	1	
1953	14	
1954	11	
1955	14	
1956	12	
1957	13	
1958	13	
1959	16 †	
1960s
1960	16	
1961	21	
1962	12	
1963	17	
1964	23	
1965	24 †	
1966	20	
1967	14	
1968	21	
1969	18	
1970s
1970	14	
1971	13	
1972	17	
1973	17	
1974	21 †	
1975	20	
1976	16	
1977	18	
1978	14	
1979	18	
1980s
1980	24 †	
1981	19	
1982	21	
1983	17	
1984	14	
1985	19	
1986	20	
1987	19	
1988	19	
1989	18	
1990s
1990	17	
1991	17	
1992	12	
1993	15	
1994	15	
1995	17	
1996	24	
1997	24	
1998	29	
1999	36 †	
2000s
2000	42 ‡	
2001	30	
2002	30	
2003	22	
2004	29	
2005	28	
2006	24	
2007	17	
2008	20	
2009	31	
2010s
2010	35	
2011	30	
2012	36	
2013	29	
2014	38 †	
2015	23	
2016	10	
2017	14	
2018	16	
2019	12	
2020s
2020	20	
2021	13	
2022	12	
2023	15	
2024	13	
2025	13	
2026	14	

== See also ==
- List of NME number-one singles of the 1970s – the original chart source continued to independently compile a chart
- List of NME number-one singles of the 1980s – the original chart source continued to independently compile a chart
