= Scrumpy =

Type of cider produced in the West of England

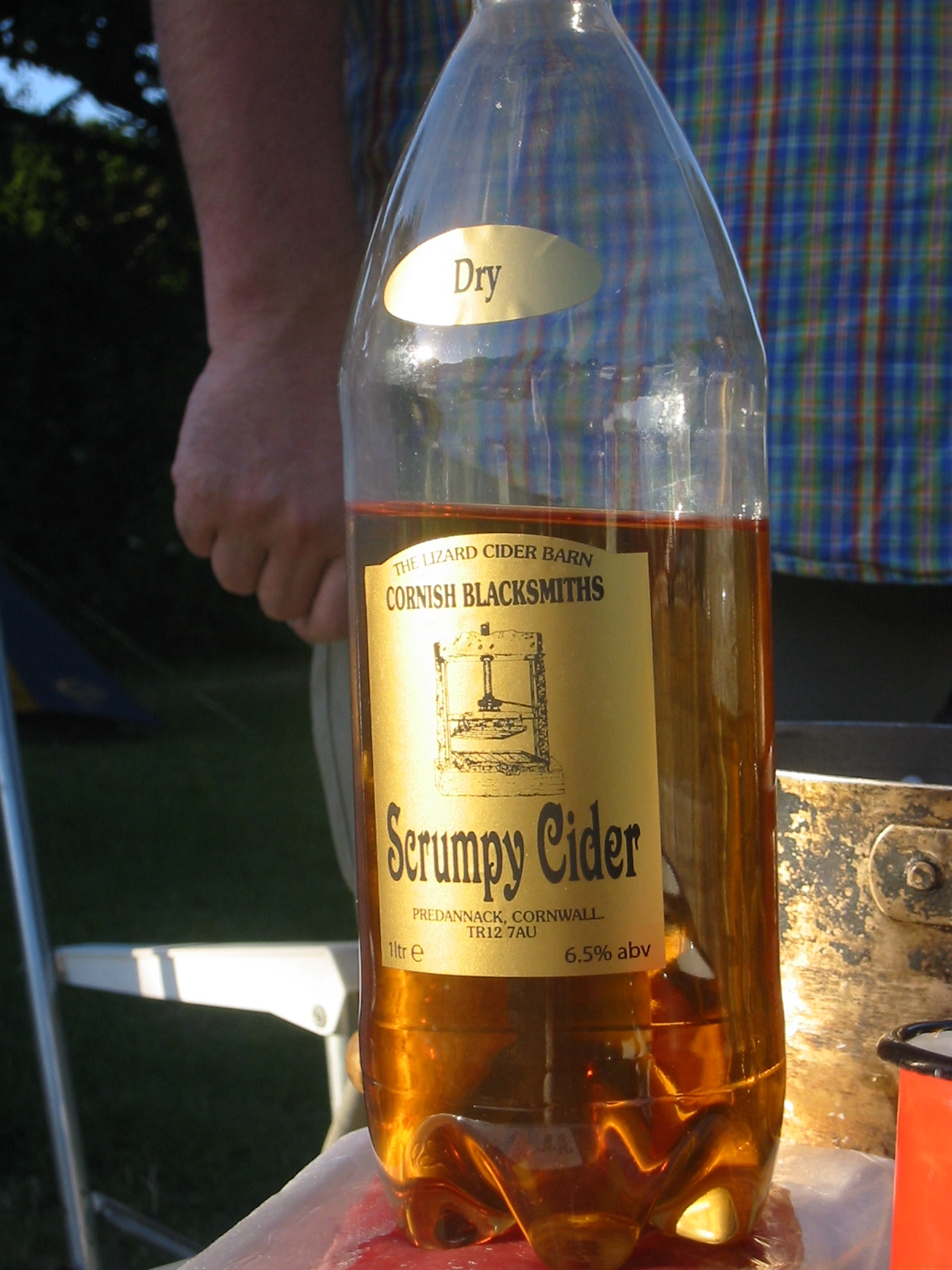
- A bottle of commercially produced scrumpy from Cornwall.
- Type: Cider
- Origin: West of England
- Ingredients: Apples

Scrumpy is a type of cider originating in the West of England, particularly the West Country. Traditionally, the dialect term "scrumpy" was used to refer to what was otherwise called "rough", a harsh cider made from unselected apples.

Today the term is more often used to distinguish locally made ciders produced in smaller quantities and using traditional methods, from mass-produced branded ciders.

== Etymology ==
Various origins of the name scrumpy have been proposed. The Oxford English Dictionary, which finds the term first used in 1904, derives it from the noun scrump, meaning "something withered or dried up", not specifically apples. Other claimed derivations include a noun scrimp with the same meaning, derived from a verb scrump, meaning "to steal fruit". Neither of these meanings is attested in the Oxford English Dictionary. The English Dialect Dictionary confirms the existence of the word scrump applied to "anything small or undersized", particularly apples, and notes a related word scrumpling for a small apple. It can be applied to basic homemade ciders as well as to commercially produced and marketed varieties.

In 1997 a legal case on trademark law was fought in Ireland between Symonds and Showerings (Ireland), in which the defendant successfully argued that "scrumpy" was a part of the "commonage" of the language, being a generic term referring to rough dry farmhouse cider.

== Production ==
Traditional "rough" was invariably fermented out to absolute dryness, with a strong, full bodied character but no distinguishable apple flavour: in 19th century Devon "rough" was much preferred for home consumption, while sweeter, less alcoholic cider was produced for an 'export' market outside the county. "Rough" was known as the customary drink of farm labourers in the west of England, who would generally receive up to a quart (1.1 litres) daily as an incentive on top of their wages.

Modern scrumpy can be dry or sweet, and is usually still rather than carbonated, but may have some degree of carbonation. However, it tends to be stronger in alcohol and more tannic than most commercial ciders. Due to its traditional methods of production, it is usually very pulpy, and resultantly often cloudy in appearance.

It is produced by pulping and pressing a quantity of apples, and then adding the juice to a vessel with a special lid to ensure the pressure does not rise too much. It may be necessary to add a Campden tablet to prevent undesirable bacterial action, and the vessel must be sanitized. The vessels are sealed and left to ferment for a few months.

== Other uses ==
As well as scrumpy made with apples, there also exists pear scrumpy, similar to perry. Scrumpy and Western describes a kind of music from the West Country, where scrumpy is traditionally produced, typified by The Wurzels.

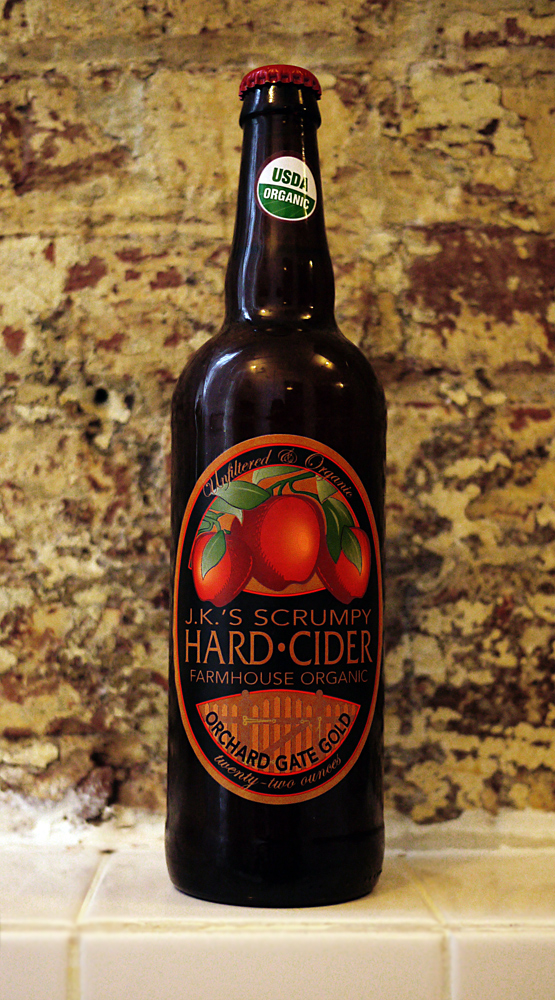
A bottle of 6.0% Abv, organic scrumpy from the USA.

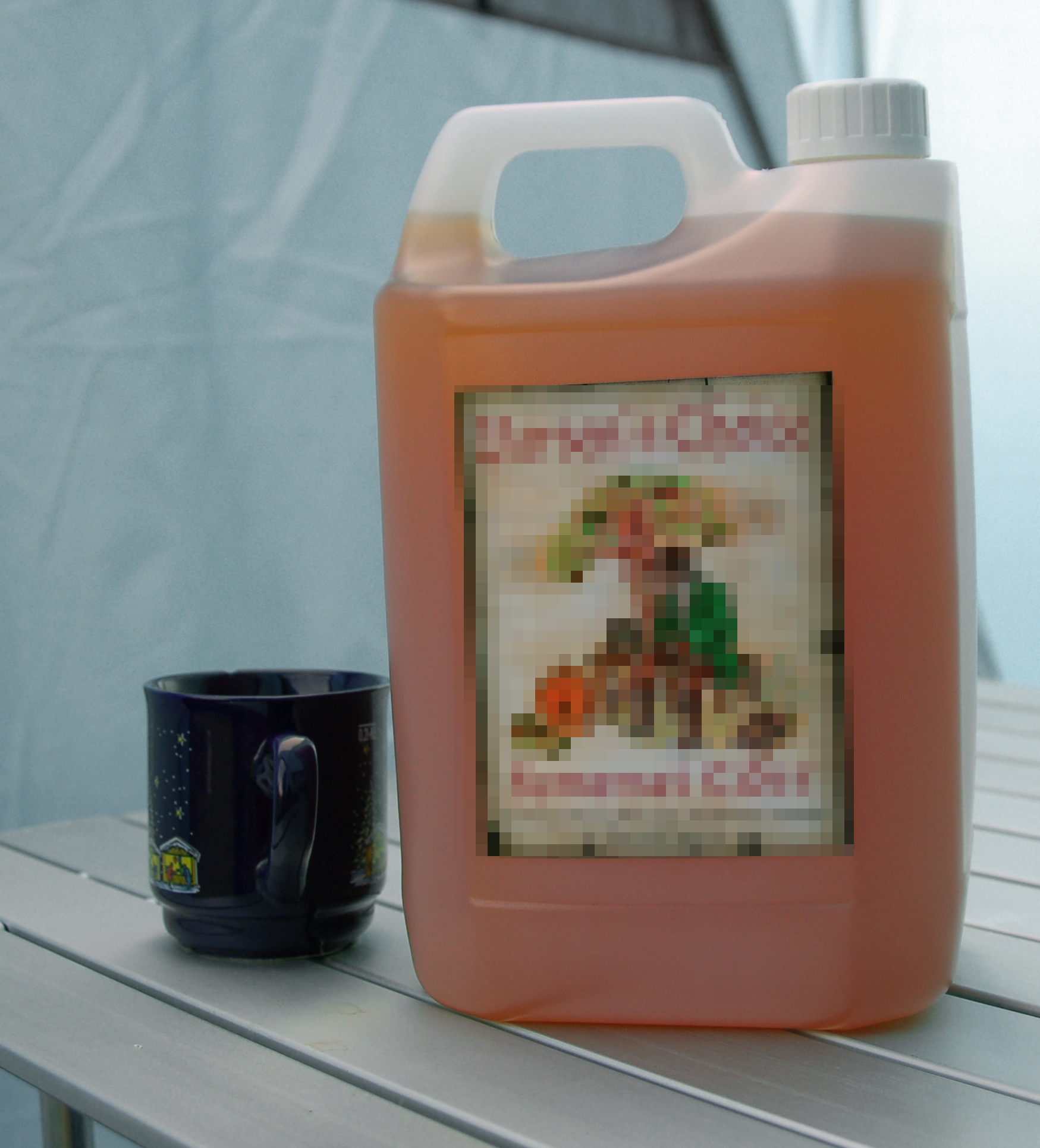
A gallon of Parson's Choice Somerset scrumpy.
