= The Combine Harvester =

1975 novelty song, a hit for Brendan Grace in Ireland

Single by Brendan Grace
- Released: 1975
- Genre: Novelty; Scrumpy and Western
- Composer(s): Melanie Safka
- Lyricist(s): Brendan O'Shaughnessy (new lyrics)

"The Combine Harvester"

Single by The Wurzels
- B-side: "The Blackbird"
- Released: May 1976
- Genre: Novelty; Scrumpy and Western
- Length: 3:03
- Label: Solo, EMI
- Producer(s): Tommy Ellis, Bob Barratt

Official Audio
- "The Combine Harvester (Brand New Key)" on YouTube

"The Combine Harvester" is a novelty song which was a number one hit for Brendan Grace in Ireland in 1975 and then also for The Wurzels in the UK in 1976. Written by Brendan O'Shaughnessy, the song is a parody of Melanie Safka's 1971 hit "Brand New Key", with rustic lyrics replacing the original theme of roller-skating.

In the UK the song was released by The Wurzels, a band from Somerset with a rustic West Country style which they called "Scrumpy and Western". It reached number one on 12 June 1976 and stayed there for two weeks.

== Charts ==
Chart (1975)	Peak position
Irish Singles Chart	1
Chart (1976)	Peak position
UK Singles Chart	1
Chart (1976)	Peak position
Australia (Kent Music Report)	97

== Certifications ==
Region	Certification	Certified units/sales
United Kingdom (BPI)	Silver	250,000^{^}
^{^} Shipments figures based on certification alone.
