= Adge Cutler =

English singer

- Adge Cutler

Background information
- Born: Alan John Cutler; 19 November 1930; Portishead, Somerset, England
- Died: 5 May 1974 (aged 43) Chepstow, Wales
- Genre: Scrumpy and Western
- Instrument: Singing
- Years active: 1966–1974
- Label: EMI Columbia
- Formerly of: The Wurzels

Alan John "Adge" Cutler (19 November 1930 – 5 May 1974) was an English singer best known as the frontman of the comic folk band the Wurzels. Cutler was known for his songs, but also his dry, West Country humour, and gained the unofficial title of "The Bard of Avonmouth".

== Early life ==
Alan John Cutler was born in Portishead, Somerset. Nicknamed 'Adge' by his friends, from his initials A.J., he lived in the small North Somerset town of Nailsea. He spent his earlier years pursuing various jobs he would use as material for later songs, including road manager for Acker Bilk, working in a cider mill (Coates of Nailsea), and working on building a power station in North Wales. He spent a year in Spain working as an agent looking for property. During his time there he grew to love the country and the Spanish way of life, as well as becoming fluent in Spanish.

On 2 September 1972, he married Yvonne, moving to Tickenham, a few miles north of Nailsea.

The first biography of Adge Cutler, Adge: King of the Wurzels, by John Hudson, was published by Bristol Books in November 2012.

== Musical career ==
Cutler's songs are largely sung in his own accent, though some are in an exaggerated Bristolian accent, and one in West Indian dialect. Cutler was influenced by Len "Uke" Thomas, a singer who left no recordings but who sang in the Bristolian dialect and who was a well known Bristol entertainer.

Virtually all of Cutler's recordings are live; one album, Cutler of the West, was recorded at the Webbington Country Club, which is very easy to see on the M5 motorway, on the slopes of Crook Peak.

== Death ==
On 5 May 1974, he died when he crashed his MGB sports car on a roundabout in Chepstow, following a Wurzels concert. Cutler is buried in the graveyard of Christ Church, Nailsea.

A bronze statue of Cutler was installed outside the Royal Oak pub in Nailsea in October 2016. In June 2020, the statue was defaced by the addition of googly eyes, but these were quickly removed.

== Songs ==
Some of Cutler's best known songs include:

"Pill Pill" – A song about Pill, Somerset, a village dear to Adge's heart

"When the Common Market Comes to Stanton Drew" – Written in response to opening up of trade with Europe, Adge suggests what might happen to Somerset culture when Europeans come over.

"Champion Dung Spreader" – An answer song to "My Old Man's a Dustman", where Adge tells of his father's occupation as a champion dung spreader.

"Thee's Gott'n where thee cassn't back'n hassn't" – A song about a young couple getting into all sorts of jams in their new car around Bristol (except for one verse, which happens in Paris), very double-entendre-ish. Much of it is sung in Bristolian. The title is 'translated' as "You've got it where you can't reverse it, haven't you?".

"The Charlton Mackrell Jugband" – About a village band and their rise to the top of the charts. The fictitious band members are Amos Draper, Bernard Mace, Arnold Slugg and the singers (we assume to be Adge). The name of Charlton Mackrell is not used in the lyrics, so other bands have adapted it; including "the Piddletrenthide Jugband".

"Drink Up Thy Zyder" – Regarded as the National anthem of North Somerset and Bristol, if not all of Somerset. Also the 'theme tune' of Bristol City F.C.

"Don't tell I Tell 'ee" – A song about not wanting to be burdened with others' troubles.

"Twice Daily" – Considered one of Adge's best known and loved songs, it was released as a B-Side on the band's first single "Drink up thy Zyder" in 1967. Deemed too raunchy and banned by the BBC, it tells the story of a farm labourer who begins a physical relationship with a female fellow worker called 'Lucy Bailey'. ("She ups 'n slips, zummat rips, I went there Twice Daily!"). This results in her pregnancy and a subsequent shotgun wedding arranged by her father. All ends happily, however, since they spend 40 years together and produce a further nine children, with no apparent slowdown in the physical side of the relationship either. ("Tho' I'm old and grey when I gets me way, I still go there Twice Daily..").

== See also ==
- Official comprehensive discography website for Adge Cutler and The Wurzels.
- Scrumpy & Western EP
- List of bands from Bristol

'Adge, King of the Wurzels' by John Hudson (2012) ISBN 978-1-909446-01-4
