= Scrumpy and Western =

Musical genre

- Stylistic origins: Folk music; Country music; Novelty song; music of the West Country
- Cultural origins: 1960s, West Country

Other topics
- West Country English

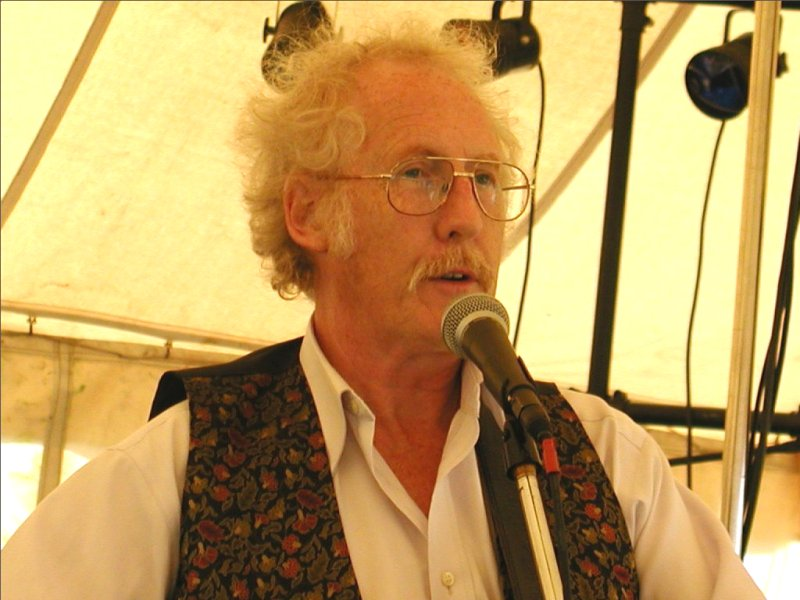
Fred Wedlock

Scrumpy and Western is music from England's West Country that fuses comical folk-style songs, often full of double entendre, with affectionate parodies of more mainstream musical genres, all delivered in the local accent/dialect. The name, taken from the title of the 1967 Scrumpy & Western EP by Adge Cutler and the Wurzels, refers to scrumpy, strongly alcoholic cider produced in the West Country; it is a play on the American genre of country and western music.

Styles vary by band or musician, and very few are known outside their native county. The main exceptions to this are the Wurzels (originally "Adge Cutler and the Wurzels"), a Somerset group who had a number one hit in the UK Singles Chart with "The Combine Harvester" in 1976. This followed an earlier UK hit single with "Drink Up Thy Zider", an unofficial West Country anthem, especially among supporters of Bristol City Football Club. This gained notoriety when the BBC refused to play its B-side song, "Twice Daily", due to concern about the unseemly subject matter (a shotgun wedding). "Combine Harvester" itself was a version of Melanie's "Brand New Key" reworded by Irish comedian and singer Brendan Grace, charting Number One in Ireland in 1975, a year before The Wurzel's further reworded cover would hit UK Number One. Other songs borrowed the style and made fun of the themes of Country and Western, and other US and British popular music.

Other artists whose music is Scrumpy and Western in flavour include the Yetties from the village of Yetminster in Dorset, the Golden Lion Light Orchestra from Worcestershire, Fred Wedlock, Who's Afear'd (also from Dorset), the Skimmity Hitchers (a group that includes former members of Who's Afear'd), Trevor Crozier, and the Pigsty Hill Light Orchestra.

== See also ==
- West Country dialects
