= Sea Power discography =

Band discography

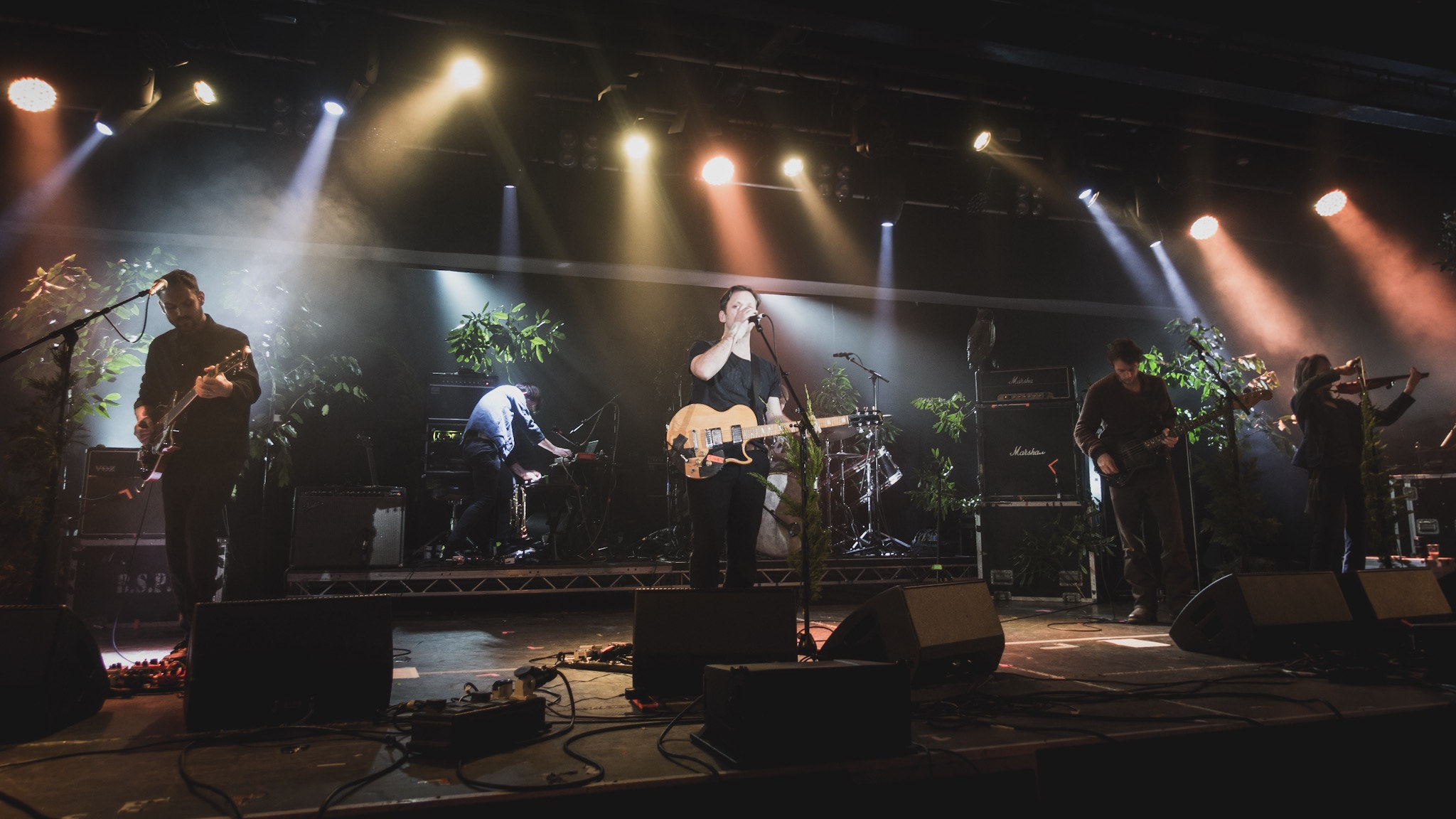
- British Sea Power in January 2018
- Studio albums: 10
- EPs: 6
- Soundtrack albums: 3
- Compilation albums: 7
- Singles: 27
- Music videos: 12
- Miscellaneous: 4

English rock band Sea Power, previously known as British Sea Power, have released 10 studio albums, 4 soundtrack albums, 6 extended plays, 58 compilation appearances, 27 singles, 12 music videos and 4 miscellaneous

British Sea Power released their debut album The Decline of British Sea Power on 2 June 2003. In the UK it reached 54 in the peak chart position and earned a silver certification. The Decline of British Sea Power released 4 singles; "Fear of Drowning", "Remember Me", "The Lonely", "Carrion/Apologies to Insect Life".

The band's second studio album Open Season on 4 April 2005. In the UK it reached 13 in the peak chart position and earned a silver certification. Its lead single "It Ended On an Oily Stage" reached 18 in the UK charts and NME naming it Track of the Week, while "Please Stand Up" reached 34 in the UK charts and received positive reviews for the music video.

The third studio album Do You Like Rock Music? was released on 14 January 2008. It reached 10 in the UK, 5 in the US and 97 in the Netherlands in its peak chart positions. Its lead single "No Lucifer" was unable to make in the charts, while "Waving Flags" reached 31 on the UK charts.

Their fourth soundtrack/studio album Man of Aran was released on 18 May 2009 accompanying the 1934 movie of the same title. It has released titular song "Man of Aran" and another similar track called "Woman of Aran".

British Sea Power's fifth studio album Valhalla Dancehall was released on 10 January 2011. It has reached 22 in the UK and 14 in the US peak chart positions. It has lead single "Living Is So Easy" which was also released digitally, "Who's In Control", "Georgie Ray" which was inspired by George Orwell and Ray Bradbury, "Cleaning Out the Rooms" was released on the album and Zeus, same with "Mongk II" entitled "Mongk".

A sixth studio album Machineries of Joy was released on 1 April 2013. It reached on the UK album chart and 19 on the regular chart. It has 4 singles including its titular lead single "Machineries of Joy", "Loving Animals", "Monsters of Sunderland" and "Facts Are Right".

From the Sea to the Land Beyond, seventh soundtrack/studio album, was released for the movie of the same title on 2 December 2013. It was performed by the band for their love of nature and wildlife and plays the titular song during some part in the film. It has also done some reworks of previous tracks such as "Carrion", "No Lucifer" and "The Great Skua" all with new material.

Their eighth soundtrack/studio album Sea of Brass was released on 30 October 2015. It features songs from previous albums and was released as an expanded edition, a deluxe boxset and a DVD. They performed most of the songs with Brass Bands across the UK.

Studio album nine, Let the Dancers Inherit the Party was released on 31 March 2017. It includes singles "Bad Bohemian", "Keep on Trying (Sechs Freunde)" and "Electrical Kittens". They also released a four-disc box set with bonus discs of demos, alternative versions and instrumentals. The deluxe two-disc version has an extended version of "Saint Jerome" with a length of 5:35.

== Studio albums ==
| Title | Album details | Peak chart positions | | | | | | | | | Certifications |
| Title | Album details | UK | UK Down. | UK Indie | UK Vinyl | IRE | NLD | SCO | US Heat. | US Indie | Certifications |
|---|---|---|---|---|---|---|---|---|---|---|---|
| The Decline of British Sea Power | Released: 2 June 2003; Label: Rough Trade (#RTRAD090); Formats: CD, LP | 54 | — | 6 | — | — | — | 56 | — | — | BPI: Silver |
| Open Season | Released: 4 April 2005; Label: Rough Trade (#RTRAD200); Formats: CD, LP | 13 | — | 2 | — | — | — | 17 | 38 | 32 | BPI: Silver |
| Do You Like Rock Music? | Released: 14 January 2008; Label: Rough Trade (#RTRAD300); Formats: CD, LP, download | 10 | 3 | 2 | — | 37 | 97 | 14 | 5 | — | BPI: Silver |
| Valhalla Dancehall | Released: 10 January 2011; Label: Rough Trade (#RTRAD549); Formats: CD, LP, download | 22 | 25 | 2 | — | — | — | 31 | 14 | 49 | |
| Machineries of Joy | Released: 1 April 2013; Label: Rough Trade (#RTRAD666); Formats: CD, LP, download | 19 | 38 | 2 | — | — | — | 27 | — | — | |
| Sea of Brass | Released: 30 October 2015; Label: Golden Chariot (#GCR15); Formats: CD, LP, download | 139 | — | 23 | 35 | — | — | — | — | — | |
| Let the Dancers Inherit the Party | Released: 31 March 2017; Label: Golden Chariot (#GCR17); Formats: CD, LP, download | 21 | 24 | — | 10 | — | — | 18 | — | — | |
| Everything Was Forever | Released: 18 February 2022; Label: Golden Chariot; Formats: CD, LP, download | 4 | — | — | — | — | — | 2 | — | — | |
"—" denotes items that did not chart or were not released in that territory.

== Compilation albums ==
| Title | Album details | Peak chart positions | | |
| Title | Album details | UK | UK Indie | SCO |
|---|---|---|---|---|
| Valhalla Dancehall - Alternative Versions And Demos | Released: 2011; Label: Golden Chariot (#GCR002); Formats: CD | — | — | — |
| Valhalla Dancehall - Remixes + Water Tower | Released: 2011; Label: Golden Chariot (#GCR005); Formats: CD | — | — | — |
| Machineries Of Joy Alternative Versions | Released: 2013; Label: Golden Chariot (#GCR12); Formats: CD | — | — | — |
| Re-Joys Machineries Of Joy Remix CD | Released: 2013; Label: Golden Chariot (#GCR13); Formats: CD | — | — | — |
| The Decline Era B-sides | Released: 2015; Label: Golden Chariot (#GCR16(b)); Formats: DL | — | — | — |
| Demos And Lost Tracks | Released: 2020; Label: Golden Chariot (#GCR18); Formats: CD, DL | — | — | — |
| Lost Tracks And Rare Demos | Released: 2024; Label: Golden Chariot (#GCR21); Formats: CD | — | — | — |
"—" denotes items that did not chart or were not released in that territory.

== Soundtrack albums ==
| Title | Album details | Peak chart positions | | |
| Title | Album details | UK | UK Indie | SCO |
|---|---|---|---|---|
| Man of Aran | Released: 18 May 2009; Label: Rough Trade (#RTRAD499); Formats: CD, LP, download | 68 | 5 | 79 |
| From the Sea to the Land Beyond | Released: 2 December 2013; Label: Rough Trade (#RTRAD679); Formats: CD, LP, download | — | 22 | — |
| Happiness | Released: 15 June 2014; Label: Golden Chariot (#GCR14); Formats: CD, LP | — | — | — |
| Disco Elysium | Released: 21 June 2020; Label: Golden Chariot; Formats: CD, download | — | — | — |
"—" denotes items that did not chart or were not released in that territory.

== Extended plays ==
- Remember Me (2003)
- The Spirit of St. Louis (2004)
- Krankenhaus? (2007)
- Zeus (2010)
- Valhalla V.I.P. (2011)
- BSP 1-6 (2012)

== Singles ==
| Year | Title | Peak chart positions | | | Album |
| Year | Title | UK | UK Indie | SCO | Album |
|---|---|---|---|---|---|
| 2001 | "Fear of Drowning" | — | — | — | The Decline of British Sea Power |
| 2001 | "Remember Me" | 114 | 43 | — | The Decline of British Sea Power |
| 2002 | "The Lonely" | 76 | 20 | — | The Decline of British Sea Power |
| 2002 | "Childhood Memories" | 90 | 23 | — | Non-album single |
| 2003 | "Carrion/Apologies to Insect Life" | 36 | 5 | 56 | The Decline of British Sea Power |
| 2003 | "Remember Me" (re-issue) | 30 | 3 | 49 | The Decline of British Sea Power |
| 2004 | "A Lovely Day Tomorrow" (with The Ecstasy of Saint Theresa) | — | — | — | Non-album single |
| 2005 | "It Ended on an Oily Stage" | 18 | 1 | 25 | Open Season |
| 2005 | "Please Stand Up" | 34 | — | — | Open Season |
| 2005 | "Remember Me/I Am a Cider Drinker" (with The Wurzels) | — | — | — | Non-album single |
| 2008 | "Waving Flags" | 31 | 1 | 5 | Do You Like Rock Music? |
| 2008 | "No Lucifer" | — | 4 | — | Do You Like Rock Music? |
| 2010 | "Living is so Easy" | — | — | — | Valhalla Dancehall |
| 2011 | "Who’s in Control" | — | — | — | Valhalla Dancehall |
| 2011 | "Georgie Ray"/"Mongk 2" | — | — | — | Valhalla Dancehall |
| 2013 | "Machineries of Joy" | — | — | — | Machineries of Joy |
| 2013 | "Monsters of Sunderland" | — | — | — | Machineries of Joy |
| 2013 | "Facts Are Right" | — | — | — | Machineries of Joy |
| 2013 | "Loving Animals" | — | — | — | Machineries of Joy |
| 2017 | "Bad Bohemian" | — | — | — | Let the Dancers Inherit the Party |
| 2017 | "Keep On Trying (Sechs Freunde)" | — | — | — | Let the Dancers Inherit the Party |
| 2017 | "Don't Let The Sun Get In The Way" | — | — | — | Let the Dancers Inherit the Party |
"—" denotes items that did not chart or were not released in that territory.

== Videos ==
- Remember Me
- Carrion/Apologies to Insect Life (VHS, Promo, PAL)
- It Ended On an Oily Stage
- Please Stand Up (VHS, PAL)
- Waving Flags
- No Lucifer
- Living Is So Easy
- Who's In Control
- Machineries of Joy
- From the Sea to the Land Beyond
- Bad Bohemian
- Keep on Trying (Sechs Freunde)
- Don't Let The Sun Get In The Way
- Two Fingers
- Folly
- Lakeland Echo

== Miscellaneous ==
- Trans-Manche Advance Portion (CDr, Sampler)
- "Close the Door" (File, MP3, 160)
- "Carrion/All In It (Remix)" (File, MP3, 128)
- Postcards From A Young Man Tour Sampler (CD, Promo, Sampler)
