= The Spirit of St. Louis (EP) =

EP by British Sea Power
- Released: 22 July 2004
- Recorded: 2002–2004
- Genre: Indie
- Length: 32:03
- Label: Toy's Factory

British Sea Power EP chronology
Remember Me (2003)	The Spirit of St. Louis (2004)	Krankenhaus? (2007)

The Spirit of St. Louis was a Japan-only EP by British Sea Power combining the title track, its fellow B-side from "The Lonely" UK single, "No Red Indian", the limited issue A Lovely Day Tomorrow, a B-side from the UK "Childhood Memories" single and a Galaxie 500 cover from a covers compilation. It also featured the video for "Remember Me".

== Track listing ==
1. "The Spirit of St. Louis" – 03:55
2. "Strange Communication" – 04:09
3. "A Lovely Day Tomorrow" – 05:00
4. "Zítra Bude Krásný Den" – 05:01
5. "Fakir" – 03:09
6. "No Red Indian" – 03:56
7. "Tugboat" (Galaxie 500 cover) – 06:49
