= The Flowers of Hell (album) =

The Flowers Of Hell

Studio album by The Flowers of Hell
- Released: November 27, 2006
- Genre: Post-rock, space rock, shoegaze
- Length: 53:39
- Label: Earworm Records
- Producer: Tim Holmes, Greg Jarvis

The Flowers of Hell chronology
| The Flowers Of Hell (2006) | Come Hell or High Water (2009) |

The Flowers Of Hell is the 2006 instrumental self-titled debut album from the experimental rock group The Flowers of Hell. It was largely recorded by Tim Holmes of Death In Vegas at the Contino Rooms in London. Peter ‘Sonic Boom’ Kember of Spacemen 3 mentored the band through its creation, mixed and performed on the track 'Through The F Hole', contributed a liner note poem to the Japanese CD version, and guest deejayed at the record's London release concert. Band leader Greg Jarvis has stated that the goal of the album was to build classical tangents from The Velvet Underground & Nico and the Spacemen 3 / early Spiritualized sound.

The record was initially released in the UK in 2006 by Earworm Records (Spacemen 3, Bright Eyes, Apples In Stereo), followed by a release in Japan in 2007 by Starmole Records.

== Critical reception ==
Professional ratings
Review scores
| Source | Rating |
|---|---|
| AllMusic | 3.5/5 stars |
| Pitchfork | 5.1 stars on a 10 point scale |
| Rock Sound | 8/10 stars |
| Evening Standard | 4/5 stars |
| Time Out | 3/6 stars |
| Q | 2/5 stars |
| The Times | 2/5 stars |

The album received coverage from a significant amount of UK press outlets including Q magazine, Rock Sound, Time Out, The Evening Standard, The Times and Metro, along with feature interviews in Japan's major music magazines (Loud, Rockin'On Japan), and reviews from key US sites (Pitchfork, AllMusic).

The release was praised for building on a unique combination of the sounds of the early Velvet Underground and the Flowers of Hell's Spacemen 3 mentors by adding strings and trumpets. Some reviews were critical that tracks meandered, yet all were in consensus that the record marked the arrival of a group to watch with The Times declaring it "classical music for shoegazers". BBC radio session recordings of the group performing songs from the album have continued to be aired on BBC 6 from 2007 through to the 2020s.

== Track listing ==
All songs written by The Flowers of Hell, except where noted.

1. The Sunrise Retreat – 3:07
2. Opt Out – 13:37
3. Sympathy for Vengeance – 7:47
4. Foreign Lands – 6:23
5. Compound Fractures – 3:56
6. Through the F Hole (Abi Fry, Greg Jarvis, Peter Kember) – 4:53
7. The Joy of Sleeping – 3:46
8. A Moment in Time – 3:34
9. Phase One Radiator – 0:52
10. Telescopic Suite – 6:09
11. Stand Easy – 2:41 (Japanese bonus track)
12. Nostradamus – 2:11 (Japanese bonus track)

== Performers ==
Band

- Ruth Barlow – Ebow, Telecaster, Melodica, Hammond
- Abi Fry – Viola
- Steve Head – Hammond, Piano, Telecaster, Bass
- Tom Hodges – Tenor Saxophone, Saw, Flute, Bass Harmonica
- Guri Hummelsund – Drums, Percussion, Vocals
- Owen James – Trumpet, Cornet
- Greg Jarvis – Stratocaster, Bells, Ebow, Vocals
- Barry Newman – Bass, Telecaster, Hammond

Guests

- Peter ‘Sonic Boom’ Kember – Vox Continental
- Julian Lwin – Tablas
- Tim Holmes – Tambourine
