= Odes (The Flowers of Hell album) =

Studio album by The Flowers of Hell
- Released: October 9, 2012
- Genre: Orchestral pop
- Length: 49:10
- Label: Optical Sounds
- Producer: Greg Jarvis, Peter J. Moore

The Flowers of Hell chronology
“O” (2010)	Odes (2012)

Released in late 2012, Odes is the fourth studio album from The Flowers of Hell. It is a covers record and the first release from the group to feature vocals and verse-chorus-verse song structures. It was premiered by Lou Reed, who opened the twelfth and final episode of his New York Shuffle radio show praising the group and airing three songs in a row, "O Superheroin" (a marriage of Laurie Anderson's "O Superman" and Lou Reed's "Heroin"), "Mr. Tambourine Man" (re-imagined to sound like The Velvet Underground circa 1967), and "Calling Occupants of Interplanetary Craft".

The group collaborated with Czech dissident musician Ivo Pospíšil (DG 307, The Plastic People of the Universe, Půlnoc) on a reworking of the Prague underground classic "Muchomůrky Bílé", and with British Sea Power's Neil Wilkinson and Abi Fry (a founding member of The Flowers of Hell and two times Mercury Prize nominee) on Fleetwood Mac's "Over and Over".

Professional ratings
Review scores
Source	Rating
Now	3/5 stars

== Track listing ==
1. Avery Island / April 1 (Neutral Milk Hotel) - 1:23
2. Atmosphere (Joy Division) - 4:38
3. Muchomůrky Bílé (Destroying Angel) (Plastic People of The Universe) - 3:47
4. Walk On The Wild Side (Lou Reed) - 3:30
5. Run Run Run (The Velvet Underground) - 4:27
6. The Last Beat of My Heart (Siouxsie and the Banshees) - 3:51
7. Mr. Tambourine Man (Bob Dylan) - 4:02
8. Super-Electric (Stereolab) - 3:56
9. O Superheroin ("O Superman" by Laurie Anderson / "Heroin" by Lou Reed) - 4:36
10. Over and Over (Fleetwood Mac) - 4:19
11. Calling Occupants Of Interplanetary Craft (Klaatu) - 5:03
12. On A Swirling Ship (Greg Jarvis) - 2:57

Bonus Tracks

1. The Last Beat of My Heart (Orchestral Mix) (Siouxsie and the Banshees) - 3:44
2. No Side To Fall In (The Raincoats) - 1:48

== Personnel ==
- Greg Jarvis – electric guitar, piano, Hammond organ, harmonica, drums, vibraphone, vocals
- Jeremiah Knight – electric guitar, acoustic guitar
- Chris McCann – electric guitar
- Owen James – trumpet
- Ira Zingraff – trumpet
- Yvo Boom – baritone sax
- Laura C. Bates – violin
- Rose Bolton – violin
- Lee Rose – violin
- Jeff Taylor – violin
- Jennifer Moersch – cello
- Barry Newman – harmonica
- Abi Fry – piano, vocals
- Brian Taylor – Hammond organ, flute
- Steve Head – bass
- Ronnie Morris – bass
- Neil Wilkinson – bass, vocals
- Hollie Stevenett – double bass
- Sean Berry – drums & percussion
- Ami Spears – drums & percussion, vocals
- Francis Hurley – vocals
- Tamara Kubova – vocals
- Ivo Pospíšil – vocals
- Laura Rafferty – vocals
- Debbie Suede – vocals
