= Remember Me =

Remember Me may refer to:

== Film and television ==
=== Film ===
- Remember Me (1979 film), an American documentary short by Dick Young
- Remember Me (1985 film), an Australian TV movie
- Remember Me? (film), a 1997 British comedy by Nick Hurran
- Remember Me (2010 film), an American romantic coming-of-age drama by Allen Coulter
- Remember Me (2013 film), a Canadian short film by Jean-François Asselin
- Remember Me (2016 film), an American comedy by Steve Goldbloom
- Remember Me (2019 film), a Spanish-American-French romantic comedy by Martin Rosete

=== Television ===
- Remember Me (TV series), a 2014 British drama serial
- "Remember Me" (The 100), a 2015 episode
- "Remember Me?" (Dexter's Laboratory), a 2002 episode
- "Remember Me" (Law & Order: Special Victims Unit), a 2018 episode
- "Remember Me" (Shake It Up), a 2013 episode
- "Remember Me" (Shameless), a 2009 episode
- "Remember Me" (Star Trek: The Next Generation), a 1990 episode

== Literature ==
- Remember me., a poem by Lydia Sigourney (1827).
- Remember Me..., a 2008 The Soldier Returns novel by Melvyn Bragg
- Remember Me (book series), a 1989–1995 book series written by Christopher Pike
- Remember Me (Clark novel), 1994
- Remember Me? (novel), a 2008 novel by Sophie Kinsella
- Remember Me, a 2003 novel by Lesley Pearse
- Remember Me, a 1976 novel by Fay Weldon
- "Remember Me", a 2003 short story by Nancy Farmer
- "Remember Me", the original title of a verse by David Harkins better known by its opening line "You can shed tears that she is gone"

== Music ==
=== Albums ===
- Remember Me (Frank Strozier album) or the title song, 1977
- Remember Me (Kokia album) or the title song, 2003
- Remember Me (Michael Schulte album) or the title song, 2023
- Remember Me (Sage the Gemini album) or the title song, 2014
- Remember Me (British Sea Power EP) or the title song (see below), 2003
- Remember Me (Oh My Girl EP) or the title song, 2018
- Remember Me: Essential, Vol. 1, by RuPaul, 2017
- Remember Me, Vol. 1, by Willie Nelson, 2011
- (Remember Me) I'm the One Who Loves You (album), by Dean Martin, 1965
- Remember Me, by Otis Redding, 1992

=== Songs ===
- "Remember Me" (Blue Boy song), 1997
- "Remember Me" (Cliff Richard song), 1987
- "Remember Me" (Coco song), from the film Coco, 2017
- "Remember Me" (D4vd song), 2024
- "Remember Me" (Daley song), 2012
- "Remember Me" (Diana Ross song), 1970
- "Remember Me" (Dove Cameron song), 2020
- "Remember Me" (Hoobastank song), 2002
- "Remember Me" (Jennifer Hudson song), 2017
- "Remember Me" (Sea Power song), 2001
  - "Remember Me"/"I Am a Cider Drinker", a split single by British Sea Power and the Wurzels, 2005
- "Remember Me" (T.I. song), 2009
- "Remember Me" (The Zutons song), 2004
- "(Remember Me) I'm the One Who Loves You", by Stuart Hamblen, 1950
- "Remember Me", by Black Stone Cherry from Magic Mountain, 2014
- "Remember Me", by Downhere from Wide-Eyed and Mystified, 2006
- "Remember Me", by Edenbridge from My Earth Dream, 2008
- "Remember Me?", by Eminem from The Marshall Mathers LP, 2000
- "Remember Me", by Fleetwood Mac from Penguin, 1973
- "Remember Me", by D4vd from Arcane League of Legends: Season 2, 2024
- "Remember Me", by Gummy from the Hotel del Luna TV series soundtrack, 2019
- "Remember Me", by Hinder from The Reign, 2017
- "Remember Me", by Ina Wroldsen, 2018
- "Remember Me", by Journey from the Armageddon film soundtrack, 1998
- "Remember Me", by Khia from Thug Misses, 2002
- "Remember Me", by Kutless from It Is Well, 2009
- "Remember Me", by Neil Diamond from You Don't Bring Me Flowers, 1978
- "Remember Me", by Nicki Minaj from The Pinkprint tenth anniversary edition, 2024
- "Remember Me", by Reverend Horton Heat from Lucky 7, 2002
- "Remember Me?", written by Harry Warren and Al Dubin for the film Mr. Dodd Takes the Air, 1937

== Software ==
- Remember Me (software), a Bible memory app
- Remember Me (video game), a 2013 action adventure game

== Food ==
- Remember Me (or RM soup), a regional name for the dish Soup Number Five in the Philippines

== See also ==
- Dido's Lament
- Recuérdame (disambiguation)
