= Live at The Music Gallery =

Live At The Music Gallery

Live album by The Flowers of Hell
- Released: November 30, 2010
- Genre: Post-rock, Shoegaze, Avant-garde
- Length: 45:54
- Label: Spectralite Music
- Producer: Peter J. Moore, Perren Baker, Greg Jarvis

Live At The Music Gallery is a live album and concert film which captures the launch show for Flowers Of Hell’s Come Hell Or High Water LP. It was initially released as a DVD package with the group’s 2010 album, “O”.

== Critical reception ==
Drowned in Sound music critic Dom Gourlay declared it “a startling document of a unique ensemble at its most potently creative, with ne'er a bum note or false start in sight.”

== Credits ==
- Producer & Director - Greg Jarvis
- Editor - Ian Jarvis
- Camera - Avery Strok and Graeme Phillips
- Audio Recording - Perren Baker
- Audio Mixing & Mastering - Peter J. Moore
- Baritone Saxophone - Regis Pomes
- Cello - Jennifer Moersch
- Double Bass - Hollie Stevenett
- Drums & Tympanis - Ami Spears, Linda Noelle Bush
- Electric Bass - Ronnie Morris
- Flute - Brian Taylor
- Guitar - Greg Jarvis, Jeremiah Knight
- Piano - Greg Jarvis
- Trumpet - Ira Zingraff
- Violin - Laura C. Bates, Tanya Charles
