= Open Season (British Sea Power album) =

Studio album by British Sea Power
- Released: 4 April 2005
- Recorded: Kore Studios, London and Rockfield Studios, South Wales in 2004
- Genres: Indie rock, post-punk revival
- Length: 46:36
- Label: Rough Trade
- Producer: Mads Bjerke / Graham Sutton

British Sea Power chronology
The Decline of British Sea Power (2003)	Open Season (2005)	Do You Like Rock Music? (2008)

Singles from Open Season
- 1. "It Ended on an Oily Stage" Released: 21 March 2005; 2. "Please Stand Up" Released: 23 May 2005

Open Season is the second album from the Brighton-based English band, British Sea Power, which later changed its name to "Sea Power". It was released on 4 April 2005 to positive reviews. It showcased a more accessible, mainstream sound and reached No. 13 in the UK Albums Chart. Almost all of the songs on the album were recorded with Mads Bjerke, who had previously worked with the band on their 2003 album, The Decline of British Sea Power and also with Primal Scream, Girls Aloud and Spiritualized, and mixed by Bill Price, with the exceptions of "Please Stand Up" and "North Hanging Rock", which were produced and mixed by Graham Sutton and engineered by Phill Brown. "Oh Larsen B" was recorded by George Apsion and Tariq Zaid Al-Nasrawi. Two singles were released from the album, "It Ended on an Oily Stage" (UK No. 18) and "Please Stand Up" (UK No. 34).

When the CD is rewound 2:31 before the first track, an organ version of the song "How Will I Ever Find My Way Home?" is found.

The lyrics and title of "Oh Larsen B" refer to the Antarctic Peninsula ice shelf Larsen B, which collapsed in 2002, a few years before the release of the album.

== Critical reception ==
Professional ratings
Aggregate scores
Source	Rating
Metacritic	76/100
Review scores
Source	Rating
AllMusic	4/5 stars
Drowned in Sound	(8/10)
The Guardian	4/5 stars
Pitchfork	(7.8/10)
Playlouder	4/5 stars
PopMatters	(4/10)
Stylus Magazine	A-

Open Season was met with "generally favorable" reviews from critics. At Metacritic, which assigns a weighted average rating out of 100 to reviews from mainstream publications, the release received an average score of 76, based on 30 reviews.

== Track listing ==
1. "It Ended on an Oily Stage" (Hamilton/Noble/Wood/Yan) – 4:23
2. "Be Gone" (Yan) – 2:52
3. "How Will I Ever Find My Way Home?" (Hamilton) – 3:11
4. "Like a Honeycomb" (Yan) – 4:31
5. "Please Stand Up" (Yan) – 3:07
6. "North Hanging Rock" (Yan) – 4:26
7. "To Get to Sleep" (Hamilton/Noble/Wood/Yan) – 3:16
8. "Victorian Ice" (Yan) – 3:26
9. "Oh Larsen B" (Yan) – 5:30
10. "The Land Beyond" (Hamilton) – 4:01
11. "True Adventures" (Hamilton) – 7:52

=== Japanese release bonus track ===
12. "Don't You Want to Be a Bird?" (Hamilton) – 2:55

== Personnel ==
- Yan – vocals, guitar, piano, organ
- Hamilton – vocals, bass guitar, guitar, piano, organ, backing vocals
- Noble – guitar, piano, backing vocals, organ
- Wood – drums

=== Additional personnel ===
- Abi Fry – viola
- Phil Sumner – cornet
- Graham Sutton – string arrangements and additional programming
- Axl – miniature Italian greyhound

== Charts ==
Chart performance for Open Season
Chart	Peak position
Scottish Albums (Official Charts)	17
UK Albums (Official Charts)	13
UK Independent Albums (Official Charts)	2
UK R&B Albums (Official Charts)	14

== Release history ==
Region	Date	Label	Format	Catalog number
United Kingdom	4 April 2005	Rough Trade Records	CD	RTRADCD200
United Kingdom	4 April 2005	Rough Trade Records	LP	RTRADLP200
Japan	30 March 2005	Toy's Factory	CD	TFCK-87384
