= Man of Aran (album) =

Man Of Aran

Soundtrack album by British Sea Power
- Released: 18 May 2009
- Genre: Indie rock
- Length: 73:27
- Label: Rough Trade

British Sea Power chronology
Do You Like Rock Music? (2008)	Man Of Aran (2009)	Valhalla Dancehall (2011)

Professional ratings
Review scores
Source	Rating
AllMusic	3/5 stars
BBC	(favorable)
Pitchfork Media	(6.7/10)
PopMatters	(6/10)
The Skinny	3/5 stars
This Is Fake DIY	(7/10)

Man Of Aran is a soundtrack album from Brighton-based English indie rock band Sea Power, then known as "British Sea Power". It was released on 18 May 2009 in the UK. The CD album was released with an accompanying DVD of the 1934 film Man of Aran, to which the album serves as a score.

== Track listing ==
1. "Man of Aran" (Hamilton) - 3:39
2. "The South Sound" - 11:32
3. "Come Wander with Me" (Jeff Alexander) - 4:11
4. "Tiger King" (Noble) - 5:16
5. "The Currach" - 2:10
6. "Boy Vertiginous" (Yan) - 5:16
7. "Spearing the Sunfish" - 11:42
8. "Conneely of the West" (Hamilton) - 4:20
9. "The North Sound" (Hamilton) - 4:55
10. "Woman of Aran" (Hamilton) - 4:35
11. "It Comes Back Again" (Hamilton) - 11:12
12. "No Man Is an Archipelago" (Noble) - 4:49

== Personnel ==
- Yan (Scott Wilkinson) - Vocals, guitar
- Noble (Martin Noble) - Guitar
- Hamilton (Neil Wilkinson) - Bass, vocals, guitar
- Wood (Matthew Wood) - Drums
- Abi Fry (Abi Fry) - Viola
- Phil The Wandering Horn (Phil Sumner) - Cornet

== Artwork ==
The sleeve was designed by BSP, Wood and Alison Fielding, with the sleevenotes written by Vince Trident.
