= Disco Elysium (soundtrack) =

Soundtrack for the video game Disco Elysium

Soundtrack album by Sea Power
- Released: December 23, 2019
- Genre: Indie rock; post-punk; ambient; video game music
- Length: 102:21
- Label: Golden Chariot

Sea Power chronology
Let the Dancers Inherit the Party (2017)	Disco Elysium (2019)	Everything Was Forever (2022)

Disco Elysium is a soundtrack album created by Sea Power for the 2019 game of the same name. It was initially released on December 23, 2019, before being reissued with two bonus tracks to accompany The Final Cut expansion for the game Disco Elysium. Production of the soundtrack began after Sea Power was approached by Disco Elysium's lead designer Robert Kurvitz, the two frequently collaborating throughout the soundtrack's creation. The soundtrack was positively received, and won a BAFTA for best Video Game Music.

== Production ==
During the development of Disco Elysium, lead designer Robert Kurvitz specifically sought out Sea Power to compose the game's soundtrack. Kurvitz approached the band while they were on tour, describing the game and talking about Sea Power's previous work. While Kurvitz was a superfan of Sea Power, having already inserted several references to the band into Disco Elysium, frontman Jan Scott Wilkinson was skeptical of composing for a video game. Sea Power had previously worked on soundtracks, such as one for Man of Aran, but they had never worked on a video game soundtrack. Their band manager endorsed Kurvitz, and the band agreed to create a soundtrack.

Kurvitz and Sea Power frequently collaborated during the album's development, with Sea Power being given example songs from their discography, unfinished sections of Disco Elysium, and various scene ideas to base the soundtrack on. Several songs from Sea Power's catalogue were directly adapted to the soundtrack, such as Up Against It from EP2 becoming the song Whirling In Rags. Sea Power was also inspired by works such as Roadside Picnic, Angelo Badalamenti's work for David Lynch and the soundtrack of Dear Esther.

Sea Power relied on intuition to create more ambient, free-form music that would set the right mood. Violinist and vocalist Abi Fry said that while making the soundtrack, "the headspace was easy to find".

The soundtrack was released on Steam after the game, on December 23, 2019. It was later released on Bandcamp in 2021, accompanied by a physical CD release. Two triple vinyl record editions were released in June 2021 to accompany Disco Elysium's release on the Nintendo Switch and Xbox One.

== Reception ==
Writing for Game Rant, games writer Jeffrey Yu praised the soundtrack for its sonic diversity and its ability to seamlessly pair with the game, despite having been created by a band rather than a composer or sound designer.

Sea Power grew in popularity after the release of Disco Elysium, as fans of the game began listening to the band and attending shows.

=== Awards ===
Year	Award	Category	Result	Ref.
2020	SXSW Gaming Awards	Excellence in Musical Score	Nominated	
2020	16th British Academy Games Awards	Music	Won	

== Track listing ==
Disco Elysium track listing
No.	Title	Length
1.	"Instrument of Surrender"	05:26
2.	"Whirling-In-Rags, 8am"	04:34
3.	"Detective Arriving on the Scene"	05:10
4.	"Tiger King"	05:07
5.	"Your Body Betrays Your Degeneracy"	02:27
6.	"Precinct 41 Major Crime Unit"	03:36
7.	"The Insulindian Miracle"	02:24
8.	"Polyhedrons"	03:09
9.	"Live With Me"	02:40
10.	"The Field Autopsy"	02:31
11.	"Miss Oranje Disco Dancer"	03:16
12.	"Rue de Saint-Gislaine"	02:47
13.	"The Doomed Commercial Area"	03:05
14.	"The Cryptozoologists"	02:18
15.	"Whirling-In-Rags, 8PM"	04:41
16.	"Disco Elysium, pt 1"	04:52
17.	"Disco Elysium, pt 2"	04:49
18.	"Ecstatic Vibrations, Totally Transcendent"	03:36
19.	"Saint-Brune 1147"	03:04
20.	"Martinaise, Terminal B"	04:11
21.	"We Are Not Checkmated"	03:43
22.	"Hope in Work and Joy in Leisure"	02:43
23.	"Burn, Baby, Burn"	03:11
24.	"Whirling-In-Rags, 12 PM"	03:45
25.	"La Revacholiere"	04:11
26.	"Krenel, Downwell, Somatosensor"	03:49
27.	"Off We Go Into The Wild Pale Yonder"	03:58
28.	"ZAUM"	03:18
Total length:		102:21
