= White Mischief =

White Mischief may refer to:

- White Mischief (novel), a 1982 novel by James Fox that dramatizes the events around the 1941 murder in Kenya of Josslyn Hay, 22nd Earl of Erroll
- White Mischief (film), a 1987 film based on Fox's book
- White Mischief of Botswana, the 1996 murder of Maria Magdalene "Ria" Wolmarans by Mariette Bosch
- White Mischief (liquor), a brand of Indian vodka and brandy launched in 1996
- White Mischief (festival), a steampunk-themed indoor festival, first organized in London in 2007
