= Remember Me (British Sea Power EP) =

EP by Sea Power
- Released: 17 December 2003
- Recorded: 2003
- Genre: Indie
- Length: 31:44
- Label: Toy's Factory

Sea Power EP chronology
Remember Me (2003)	The Spirit of St. Louis (2004)

Remember Me was a Japan-only EP by Sea Power, then known as "British Sea Power", collating the title track, the five B-sides from its UK single re-release and three tracks from the earlier "Carrion/Apologies to Insect Life" UK single. It is sought after mainly for its rarity, unique Japanese style packaging and as the only place to find "The Scottish Wildlife Experience" on CD.

== Track listing ==
1. "Remember Me" – 3:14
2. "Salty Water" – 3:53
3. "Good Good Boys" – 3:46
4. "Moley & Me" – 4:10
5. "The Smallest Church in Sussex" – 2:55
6. "The Scottish Wildlife Experience" – 2:56
7. "Albert's Eyes" – 3:37
8. "Carrion (Ridgeway Mix)" – 4:07
9. "Apologies to Insect Life (Russian Rock Demo)" – 3:03

== See also ==
- Remember Me (British Sea Power song)
- Carrion/Apologies to Insect Life
