= Optical Sounds =

Toronto record label

- Founded: 2008
- Founder: Robert Gibson, Richard Gibson
- Distributor: Outside Music
- Genre: Psych pop
- Country of origin: Canada
- Location: Toronto, Ontario
- Official website: opticalsounds.com

Optical Sounds is a Toronto based record label that was launched in 2008 by brothers Robert and Richard Gibson.

The label is focused on a community of underground bands with broad psychedelic influences with The Embassy Bar in Kensington Market serving as a common meeting place for the musicians.

Optical Sounds operates without contracts or employees and the organization's main focus is on community based events rather than record releases. The name Optical Sounds was taken from a track by the 1960s LA psych rock group The Human Expression. It is distributed in Canada by the Outside Music group.

Optical Sounds' roster has included Action Makes, The Auras, B17, The BB Guns, Bodies That Matter, The Disraelis, The Hoa Hoa's, The Flowers of Hell including Odes and "O", Magic Shoppe, Mimico, Ostrich Tuning, Planet Creature, Postcards, Sounds Around, Sun Stone Revolvers, Tess Parks, Twist, The Veldt, and Your 33 Black Angels.

The label's 2012 compilation Psych Pop From Toronto was curated by Spacemen 3's Will Carruthers and reached the Top 20 of the Canadian campus radio charts.

The label and its artists have showcased at Canadian Music Week, North by Northeast, and South by Southwest.

== Media ==
The label's releases and artists have appeared in media including Pitchfork, the Financial Times, The Guardian, The Quietus, Noisey/Vice, Exclaim!, Drowned In Sound, Now Magazine and on the cover of Eye Weekly, along with numerous music blogs and campus radio stations.
