= Come Hell or High Water (The Flowers of Hell album) =

Come Hell Or High Water

Studio album by The Flowers of Hell
- Released: April 6, 2009
- Genres: Space rock, post-rock, experimental
- Length: 44:20
- Labels: Benbecula Records (UK CD), Unfamiliar Records (Canadian CD), Saved By Vinyl(LP)
- Producer: Greg Jarvis

The Flowers of Hell chronology
The Flowers of Hell (2006)	Come Hell Or High Water (2009)	“O” (2010)

Come Hell or High Water is the second studio album from the experimental rock group The Flowers of Hell. Released in April 2009, the album was recorded in over 40 sessions with 30 musicians in London, Prague, Toronto, Detroit, and Texas. According to an interview in Now magazine and a review in URB, the album was conceived of as a celebration of synaesthesia, and composer Greg Jarvis based the composing, recording, arranging, and preliminary mixing on his synaesthetic visions.

Noted guests on the record include Patti Smith/Iggy Pop collaborator Ivan Kral on bass who had been a mentor to Jarvis, mix work from Spacemen 3's Peter Kember, strings from British Sea Power's Abi Fry and The Clientele's Mel Draisey and Broken Social Scene's Julie Penner, amongst others.

The LP sleeve is one of six displayed at the Tate Britain and Paris's Musee d'Orsay in their major 2020 Aubrey Beardsley retrospective. Beardsley's work was adapted for the artwork by Greg Jarvis and features in the exhibition catalogue as well as in the exhibition itself.

Professional ratings
Review scores
Source	Rating
NME	8/10 stars
Pitchfork Media (2010)	6.9 stars on a 10 point scale
URB (magazine)	4/5 stars

== Track listing ==
1. "Opus 66 (Part 1)" – 4:12
2. "Blumchen" – 6:17
3. "Forest Of Noise" – 3:44
4. "The Strength Of String" – 4:00
5. "White Out" – 3:22
6. "Darklands" – 5:08
7. "Pipe Dreams" – 5:25
8. "The Invocation" – 3:33
9. "Past Tense" – 4:41
10. "Occasional Tears" – 4:03

== Personnel ==
- Greg Jarvis – electric guitar (1, 2, 5, 6), piano (2, 9), programming (2), harmonica (5), Swerpeti (5), bass (7),
- Steve Head – acoustic guitar (5, 6)
- Owen James – trumpet (1–3, 8), trombone (8)
- Ian Thorn – trumpet (2)
- Tom Knott – trumpet (8)
- Miss Hypnotique – clarinet (5)
- Ray Dickaty – soprano saxophone, tenor saxophone (1, 3, 5)
- Tom Hodges – baritone saxophone (1, 2), flute (1), bass harmonica (2), saw (7)
- Brian Taylor – flute (1, 5, 7)
- Julie Penner – violin (1, 2, 4)
- Mel Draisey – violin (1, 2, 5, 9)
- Abi Fry – viola (1–4, 6, 9)
- Amy Laing – cello (7)
- Jeremiah Knight – E-Bow & feedback manipulation (6)
- Barry Newman – harmonica (1, 5, 9), bass (9)
- Jan P. Muchow – programming (3, 4, 10), piano (10)
- John Mark Lapham – programming (8)
- Will Carruthers – bass (1)
- Ronnie Morris – bass (2, 6)
- Ivan Kral – bass (5)
- Jon McCann – drums & percussion (1, 8)
- Linda Bush – drums & percussion (5)
- Guri Hummelsund – drums & percussion (6, 9) voice (6)
- David Gee – drums & percussion, programming (7)
- Anna-Nicole Ziesche – voice (2)
- Hazrat Inayat Khan – voice (8)
