= Childhood Memories =

Childhood Memories may refer to:

- Childhood Memories (song), a British Sea Power single
- Childhood Memories (book), the memoirs of Romanian author Ion Creangă
- Souvenirs d'enfance, an autobiographical cycle by French novelist Marcel Pagnol
