= The Flowers of Hell =

Background information
- Origin: Toronto & London
- Genres: Experimental, space rock, drone, psychedelic, post-rock, neo-classical
- Years active: 2002–present
- Labels: Optical Sounds; Unfamiliar; Benbecula Records; Fat Ghost; Saved By Vinyl; Awkward Silence; Starmole Japan; Earworm Records; Shifty Disco

The Flowers of Hell are a transatlantic experimental orchestra made up of a revolving line-up of 16 or so independent musicians based in Toronto and London. Their mostly instrumental sound builds bridges between classical music and post-rock, shoegaze, space rock and drone music, often resulting in their being described as an orchestral extension of the work of The Velvet Underground and Spacemen 3. They are led by synesthete composer Greg Jarvis. Much of their repertoire is an exploration of the timbre-to-shape synesthesia that causes Jarvis to involuntarily perceive all sounds as floating abstract visual forms.

== Accolades ==
The group's music has been championed by Lou Reed, Kevin Shields (My Bloody Valentine), and Pete 'Sonic Boom' Kember (Spacemen 3) who mentored the group through the creation of their debut album. They have had positive coverage from media including Rolling Stone, NME, Pitchfork, and BBC Radio.

== History ==
The group's name comes from the blues concept of transformation whereby the misery and toil of the musician results in the pleasure of the listener. It was first used by the group's founder Greg Jarvis on tracks included on various UK newspaper and magazine covermount CDs in 2002 and 2003, of which just under two million units were distributed. Jarvis expanded the project into a London-based live act in 2005 with the founding six piece line up consisting of himself as the principal guitarist, Guri Hummelsund on drums, Abi Fry on viola (later of British Sea Power and Bat For Lashes), Owen James on trumpet, Ruth Barlow as the accompanying guitarist, and Steve Head on Hammond organ.

In early 2008, following a move back to his native Toronto after a decade spent abroad in London and Eastern Europe, Jarvis debuted a North American branch of the group as an opening act for Spectrum (one of the post-Spacemen 3 projects of Pete 'Sonic Boom' Kember). The Flowers of Hell have since operated on both continents simultaneously with Jarvis going back and forth for concerts and all members contributing to recordings.

In 2020, their decade-old Come Hell Or High Water LP was put on display in the Tate Britain's exhibition of works by the 19th century Art Nouveau illustrator Aubrey Beardsley. The group's final performance before the coronavirus lockdown took place at the exhibition's opening gala.

Throughout the band's evolution, Jarvis has remained as its main composer and producer. Jarvis is an audio-visual synaesthete and his compositions and productions are largely based upon the abstract visions he involuntarily experiences when hearing sounds. Synaesthesia is a cognitive trait found in 4% of the population who are born with two (or more) senses intermingled. With the timbre-to-shape variant that, differing sonic timbres give rise to a visual language of sound.

Notable events in the group's history include a 2020 performance at the Tate Britain where their Come Hell Or High Water LP was on display, a 2019 performance for an audience of synesthetes at the Moscow Conservatory, NASA's mission control staff declaring their fandom and synchronizing The Flowers of Hell song Sympathy For Vengeance with fresh Discovery shuttle footage, Lou Reed highly praising the group and starting his final radio show with three of their recordings, My Bloody Valentine's Kevin Shields inviting the group to open for one of the eight dates on their 2008 reunion tour, and closing the Intersection Festival of experimental classical music on Toronto's main square in 2011 and 2015. In 2010, Greg Jarvis made headlines after being detained in Sentani, Jayapura Regency, Papua, Indonesia by rebel soldiers from the Free Papua Organization - Jarvis was mistaken for a spy and used a ukulele to prove he was a musician.

== Collaborators ==
The group's early albums saw them collaborate with many musicians who’ve been side players or leaders in well established acts from the experimental side of the indie rock genre. Performers who have guested on Flowers Of Hell recordings and/or live shows include Peter ‘Sonic Boom’ Kember (Spacemen 3), Will Carruthers (Spacemen 3, Spiritualized, Brian Jonestown Massacre), Ray Dickaty (Spiritualized), Ivan Kral (Patti Smith Group, Iggy Pop's band), Ivo Pospíšil (DG 307, Garáž), Owen Pallett (Arcade Fire), Tim Holmes (Death in Vegas), Julie Penner (Broken Social Scene, Do Make Say Think), Abi Fry (British Sea Power, Bat for Lashes), Neil 'Hamilton' Wilkinson (British Sea Power) Mel Draisey (The Clientele, Le Volume Courbe, Primal Scream), Jon McCann (Guided by Voices), Julia Morson (Toronto Mendelssohn Choir), John Mark Lapham (The Earlies), Tom Knott (The Earlies), Jan Muchow (Ecstasy of Saint Theresa).

== Discography ==
=== Studio ===
- The Flowers Of Hell (Earworm Records, 2006)
- Come Hell Or High Water (Unfamiliar Records, Benbecula Records, Saved By Vinyl, 2009)
- "O" (Optical Sounds, 2010)
- Odes (Optical Sounds, 2012)
- Symphony No.1 (Optical Sounds, 2016)
- Keshakhtaran (Space Age Recordings, 2023)

=== Live ===
- Live at The Music Gallery (Spectralite Music, 2010)

=== Compilation ===
- Outlanders (Optical Sounds, 2020)

=== EPs ===
- Aria 51 (Optical Sounds, 2015)
- Awkward 26 (Awkward Silence split single with Will Carruthers, 2008)

=== Singles ===
- "Foreign Lands" (Shifty Disco, 2005)
- "Solitary Closure" (Shifty Disco, 2005)
- "The Joy of Sleeping" (Shifty Disco, 2005)
- "Excerpt from Opt Out" (Shifty Disco, 2006)
- "Blumchen" (Shifty Disco, 2009)
- "White Out (Extended Version)" (Fat Ghost, 2009)
- "Through The F Hole (Abichestra Mix)" (2019)
- "Muchomurky Bile (Velvet Mix)" (2019)
- "Warmth Of A Christmas Chill (Single Version)" (2019)
- "The Joy Of Sleeping" (2020)
- "Opt Out (Edit)" (2020)
- "The Last Beat Of My Heart (String Mix)" (2020)

=== DVDs ===
- "Opus 66"(video on Mind Expansion Records compilation, 2009)
- Live At The Music Gallery (concert film, 2010)
- Pocta Václav Havel (bonus content, 2013)

=== Compilation appearances ===
- "Vindaloop" (Peoplesound Sampler, 2001)
- "The Joy Of Sleeping" (Allied Irish Bank Premium CD, 2002)
- "Vindaloop - Dawn" (Daily Star covermount compilation, 2002)
- "Gonna Stop (Wastin' My Time)" - Red (Red magazine covermount compilation, 2002)
- "The Joy of Sleeping - Relax" (Eve magazine covermount compilation, 2002)
- "The Sunrise Retreat" (Algidance 3, 2005)
- "Compound Fractures" - Psychedelica 2 (Northern Star Records, 2007)
- "Forest Of Noise" - Deep Wireless (NAISA compilation, 2009)
- "Darklands" - Never Lose That Feeling 3 (AC30 covers compilation, 2008)
- "The Human Illusion" - A Changing Landscape (IFAR compilation, 2012)
- "Muchomurky Bile" - Psych Pop From Toronto (Optical Sounds compilation, 2014)
- "Mr.Tambourine Man" - Strange Brew (UNCUT magazine covermount compilation, 2013)
- Psych Pop 2 (Optical Sounds compilation, 2014)
- "Heiligen" - Music For A Good Home 3 (Audioscope charity compilation, 2014)
- "Muchomurky Bile (Velvet Mix)" - 3 Garáži (Czech dissident group Garáž's 3LP boxset, 2019)
