= Machineries of Joy =

Studio album by British Sea Power
- Released: 1 April 2013
- Genre: Alternative rock
- Length: 43:04
- Label: Rough Trade

British Sea Power chronology
Valhalla Dancehall (2011)	Machineries of Joy (2013)	From the Sea to the Land Beyond (2013)

Professional ratings
Review scores
Source	Rating
Allmusic	3.5/5 stars
The Guardian	4/5 stars
Pitchfork Media	5.8/10 stars
Drowned in Sound	6/10 stars

Machineries of Joy is a studio album by British indie rock band Sea Power, then known as "British Sea Power". It was released in April 2013 on the Rough Trade record label.

The album's title track was released as a single in February 2013 in advance of the album release.

To promote the album, the band announced a UK tour in April 2013.

The album reached #2 on the UK indie album chart, and #19 on the regular chart. It also debuted at #15 on the Irish indie album chart.

== Track listing ==
Rough Trade announced the track listing as follows.

1. "Machineries of Joy" – 6:18
2. "K Hole" – 3:25
3. "Hail Holy Queen" – 3:20
4. "Loving Animals" – 5:10
5. "What You Need The Most" – 5:41
6. "Monsters of Sunderland" – 3:11
7. "Spring Has Sprung" – 3:54
8. "Radio Goddard" – 3:19
9. "A Light Above Descending" – 4:11
10. "When A Warm Wind Blows Through The Grass" – 4:40

Initial copies of the album were bundled with a bonus EP containing 5 tracks:

1. "Facts Are Right" – 2.58
2. "Fingertips" – 4.39
3. "Baby Grey" – 4.35
4. "Lullaby For What You Are" – 3.20
5. "Chrysanthemum" – 4.27

== Production ==
The band started writing the songs that would form the album at the start of 2012. These were released in the form of "enhanced demos" on limited edition EPs (see section BSP EP1-6). Later in the year, the band spent two weeks in the Welsh mountains working on completing the songs. They recorded the album in Brighton in November 2012.

== Album title ==
The name of the album (and its title track) comes from a collection of short stories by Ray Bradbury, The Machineries of Joy. Bradbury's work has influenced the band's songwriting in the past: "Something Wicked" (from The Decline of British Sea Power) refers to Bradbury's novel Something Wicked This Way Comes and "Georgie Ray" (from Valhalla Dancehall) alludes in part to Bradbury.

== BSP EP1-6 ==
Covers of a collection of BSP EPs 1-6

British Sea Power began working on the songs which would form the album in the first half of 2012, releasing six limited-edition demo EPs, one at each of their monthly Krankenhaus club nights in Brighton.

Each is titled simply BSP EPx (sometimes described as simply BSP x), 'x' running from 1 to 6.

The cover of each EP features a picture of a bird or animal wearing a hat, drawn by band member Yan (Scott Wilkinson).

=== BSP EP1 ===
1. "French Pornographic Novel"
2. "Lullaby For What You Are"
3. "Baby Grey"
4. "A Light Above Descending"
5. "Fiery"

=== BSP EP2 ===
1. "Things Have A Way of Working Out"
2. "Up Against It"
3. "Loving Animals"
4. "Machineries of Joy"
5. "Motorway South"

=== BSP EP3 ===
1. "K Hole"
2. "What You Need The Most"
3. "When A Warm Wind Blows Through The Grass"
4. "Brand New Century"
5. "Evening Will Come We Will Sew The Blue Sail"

=== BSP EP4 ===
1. "Facts Not Right"
2. "Fingertips"
3. "Spring Has Sprung"
4. "Monsters of Sunderland"
5. "To The Show"

=== BSP EP5 ===
1. "Over Your Cities Grass Will Grow"
2. "Wishful Thinking"
3. "Radio Goddard"
4. "Did You Recognise Yourself"
5. "Scafell Hotel"
6. "Wishful Thinking (bonus mix)"

=== BSP EP6 ===
1. "Warzone"
2. "Sausage Roll?"
3. "Dance Party"
4. "Beautiful Fountains"
5. "Hail Holy Queen"
6. "Chrysanthemum"
7. "Unto The End"
