= Recuérdame =

Recuérdame is Spanish for "remember me". It may refer to:

- Recuérdame (Yolandita Monge album), 1971 album or the title song
- "Recuérdame" (La 5ª Estación song), 2009 song
- "Recuérdame" (Pablo Alborán song), 2014 song by Pablo Alborán from the album Terral
- "Recuérdame", an entry by Samuel & Patricia in competition for Spain in the Eurovision Song Contest 2010
- "Recuérdame", 2015 song by Maluma from Pretty Boy, Dirty Boy
- "Recuérdame", 2001 song by Laura Pausini from Entre tú y mil mares (the Spanish-language version of Tra te e il mare)
- "Recuérdame", the Spanish version of "Remember Me", a 2017 song from the film Coco written by Robert Lopez and Kristen Anderson-Lopez

== See also ==
- "Recorda Me", a track by Joe Henderson from Page One, 1963
- Remember Me (disambiguation)
