= Greg Jarvis (musician) =

Canadian musician and composer

- Born: Toronto, Ontario, Canada
- Genres: Space rock, post-rock, classical, experimental music, rockabilly, northern soul, reggae
- Occupations: Musician, record executive, professor
- Instruments: Guitar, keyboards
- Years active: 1990s–present
- Labels: Optical Sounds, Earworm Records, Shifty Disco, Benbecula, Universal Music, BMG

Greg Jarvis is a Toronto-born musician and composer best known for his work leading the orchestral rock group the Flowers Of Hell. His various projects as a musician have received acclaim from members of The Velvet Underground, The Patti Smith Group, the Sex Pistols, The Clash, My Bloody Valentine, and Spacemen 3/Spiritualized. Jarvis's compositions are largely informed by timbre-to-shape synesthesia, a neurological trait which causes him to involuntarily see all sounds as layers of three dimensional shapes.

== Biography ==
=== Early life ===
Jarvis was born in Toronto, Ontario where he was a Royal Canadian Air Cadet band leader and served briefly in the Canadian Army reserve forces.

=== Career ===
Jarvis worked in marketing in the 1990s at the major label BMG in Toronto, Prague, Moscow, and Warsaw, and later for Universal International in London, handling acts including Nirvana, David Bowie, Dolly Parton, Kiss, Aerosmith, Guns N' Roses, Deep Purple, Annie Lennox, Patti Smith, Malcolm McLaren, Beck, Sonic Youth, and The Moody Blues, as well as Death In Vegas, Spectrum, Spiritualized, Cowboy Junkies and The Wedding Present with whose members he would later collaborate as an artist. Jarvis also worked as an executive at the BBC's Top Of The Pops where he conducted interviews with such acts as the Spice Girls, Queen, Alice Cooper, Depeche Mode, Oasis and Radiohead.

He is currently a professor at Durham College's Media, Art, & Design School where he teaches about music history and the music industry. Previously he taught as a senior lecturer in the United Kingdom at London Metropolitan University, and Buckinghamshire New University.

Jarvis has given talks at institutions including Harvard, Oxford, Juilliard, The Kerouac School, and the Art Gallery of Ontario. He wrote music related articles for the Huffington Post from 2013-2018. Presently in the 2020s, Jarvis writes interviews and cover stories for the international psychedelic rock magazine Second Scene, along with live reviews for the British music magazine Shindig.

The Tate Britain gallery included Jarvis's Come Hell Or High Water album cover adaptation of an Aubrey Beardsley illustration in their Beardsley exhibition and catalogue, with The Flowers of Hell performing at the opening ceremony, a few weeks prior to London's first coronavirus lockdown in 2020.

=== Musical history ===
Prior to the Flowers of Hell, Jarvis played on Prague's underground music scene in the 1990s, in Moscow rockabilly group Merzky Beat, and in The Red Stripes in the early 2000s (a London based comedy-reggae White Stripes tribute act he formed with drummer Guri Hummelsund.) "We stopped (The Red Stripes) when it started getting crazy big with Peel, the NME, BBC6, The Face, Duran Duran and some peripheral members of The Clash and The Sex Pistols getting into it. We signed to a Universal imprint, met The Wailers in a medieval fortress in Serbia, shot a video in Africa and felt we had to kill it before we became too known for it," Jarvis said reflecting in a 2015 Irish interview.

Jarvis produced, composed, and performed on an album of Northern Soul covers and originals by Emma Wilkinson, whom he managed after she won the 2001 Stars In Their Eyes TV talent series performing Dusty Springfield's ‘Son Of A Preacher Man’.

He founded the Flowers of Hell in London in 2002 as a studio project, growing it into a live group in 2005 recruiting bandmates Abi Fry (later of British Sea Power and Bat For Lashes), Guri Hummelsund, Ruth Barlow, Steve Head, and Owen James. He returned to Canada in 2007 and formed another branch of the group, expanding its line up to encompass musicians living in both Toronto and London. He composes many of the pieces performed by the band, and is its main guitarist.

Highlights of the group's career include Lou Reed of the Velvet Underground praising their artistry and commencing his final radio show by playing three of the group's recordings, the Tate Britain including their Come Hell Or High Water LP alongside The Beatles' Revolver in a 2020 Aubrey Beardsley exhibition and bringing the group in to perform at the opening, collaborating with members of their major influence Spacemen 3, being asked by Kevin Shields to open for My Bloody Valentine during the band's 2008 reunion, and NASA's mission control staff declaring their enjoyment of the group's ‘space rock’ with the shuttle launch team syncing footage of a Discovery mission to the Flowers Of Hell's ‘Sympathy For Vengeance’.

=== Synesthesia ===
Jarvis has auditory-visual synesthesia which causes him to involuntarily and instantaneously perceive all sounds as abstract visual shapes surrounding him. In 2013 he founded the Canadian Synesthesia Association as a way of meeting other synethetes and raising awareness of synesthesia.

=== Education ===
Jarvis did summer studies under the octogenarian beat writer Bobbie Louise Hawkins at The Jack Kerouac School of Disembodied Poetics in Boulder, Colorado.

He also completed a master of arts in higher education teaching for which his thesis focused on how the mind processes music, and he holds an Arts & Media MBA.

== Personal life ==
In 2010, Jarvis was chased by a group of protesters in West Papua New Guinea after photographing their activities. He was held and questioned by rebel soldiers from the Organisasi Papua Merdeka and played a ukulele to demonstrate he was a musician, not a foreign spy.
