= Please Stand Up =

Single by British Sea Power

from the album Open Season
- Released: 23 May 2005
- Recorded: Unknown
- Genre: Indie
- Length: CD – 9:46; E-CD – 9:50; 7" – 7:11
- Label: Rough Trade Records
- Songwriters: Martin Noble, Jan Wilkinson
- Producer: Graham Sutton

British Sea Power singles chronology
"It Ended on an Oily Stage" (2005)	"Please Stand Up" (2005)	"Remember Me/I Am a Cider Drinker" (2005)

"Please Stand Up" was the second single from British Sea Power's second album Open Season. It heralded a far more mainstream, pop-oriented and produced sound for the band. Despite predictions of it being a crossover hit, it failed to grab the attention of the public and was not popular with many of the band's fans. The video was much more commercialised than the band's normal, homemade, efforts with Super 8 film but was banned by MTV in the United States for including the line A little excitement makes us wetter wetter. The band have said that they were disillusioned by the response to the track and plan to branch off in a different direction on future releases.

The song peaked at number 34 on the UK Singles Chart.

== Track listings ==
=== CD (RTRADSCD242) ===
1. "Please Stand Up" (Yan/BSP) - 3:13
2. "Over in the Corner" (Yan/BSP) - 3:48

=== E-CD (RTRADSCDX242) ===
1. "Please Stand Up" (Yan/BSP) - 3:13
2. "Grey Goose" (Huddie Ledbetter) &- 3:28
3. "Chicken Pig (True Adventures instrumental demo)" (Hamilton/BSP) - 5:18

Also features the promo video for "Please Stand Up" as a CD-ROM extra.

=== 7" Vinyl (RTRADS242) ===
1. "Please Stand Up" (Yan/BSP) –
2. "Gale Warnings in Viking North" (Yan/BSP) –

== Notes ==
1. BRITISH SEA POWER BANNED!, NME Online, 4 May 2005.
