= Do You Like Rock Music? =

Studio album by British Sea Power
- Released: 14 January 2008
- Genres: Indie rock, post-punk revival
- Length: 54:37
- Label: Rough Trade
- Producers: BSP & Graham Sutton

British Sea Power chronology
Open Season (2005)	Do You Like Rock Music? (2008)	Man of Aran (2009)

Singles from Do You Like Rock Music?
- 1. "Waving Flags" Released: 7 January 2008; 2. "No Lucifer" Released: 10 March 2008

Do You Like Rock Music? is the third album from the Brighton-based English band, Sea Power, then known as British Sea Power. It was released on 14 January 2008 in the UK and 12 February 2008 in the United States. The album is preceded by the Krankenhaus? EP, released on digital download on 8 October 2007.

It entered the UK Albums Chart at number 10 and the Irish Albums Chart at number 37.

== Reception ==
Professional ratings
Aggregate scores
Source	Rating
Metacritic	82/100
Review scores
Source	Rating
AllMusic	4.5/5 stars
The A.V. Club	A−
Entertainment Weekly	B+
The Guardian	4/5 stars
Mojo	4/5 stars
NME	7/10
Pitchfork	8.2/10
Q	4/5 stars
Spin	3.5/5 stars
The Times	4/5 stars

It is one of the few albums to not receive an actual numerical review from Pitchfork, instead initially receiving a rating of "U.2", with a middling review citing its ambitious nature while stating "Do You Like Rock Music? doesn't fail miserably... but disappoints gently." After a change to their site layout and rating presentation, that rating now appears as 8.2, though the review itself has not changed.

== Track listing ==
No.	Title	Writer(s)	Length
1.	"All in It"	Yan/BSP	2:11
2.	"Lights Out for Darker Skies"	Yan/BSP	6:36
3.	"No Lucifer"	Hamilton/BSP	3:27
4.	"Waving Flags"	Noble/Yan/BSP	4:07
5.	"Canvey Island"	Yan/BSP	3:41
6.	"Down on the Ground"	Hamilton/BSP	4:23
7.	"A Trip Out"	Hamilton/Wood/BSP	3:16
8.	"The Great Skua"	Noble/BSP	4:35
9.	"Atom"	Yan/BSP	5:38
10.	"No Need to Cry"	Hamilton/BSP	3:43
11.	"Open the Door"	Hamilton/BSP	4:56
12.	"We Close Our Eyes"	Yan/BSP	8:04

== Personnel ==
Sea Power

- Jan Scott Wilkinson ("Yan") – vocals, guitar
- Martin Noble ("Noble") – guitar
- Neil Hamilton Wilkinson ("Hamilton") – bass, vocals, guitar
- Matthew Wood ("Wood") – drums

Additional musicians

- Abi Fry – viola, string arrangements
- Becky Foon – cello, string arrangements, choir (tracks 1 and 12)
- Eamon Hamilton – harmonium
- Phil Sumner – cornet
- Graham Sutton – additional keys and programming
- Basia Bulat – choir (tracks 1 and 12)
- Bobby Bulat – choir (tracks 1 and 12)
- Holly Rancher – choir (tracks 1 and 12)
- Howard Bilerman – choir (tracks 1 and 12)
- Jo Israel – choir (tracks 1 and 12)
- Laura Kennison – choir (track 4)
- Lisa Lindley-Jones – choir (track 4)
- Vicky Oag – choir (track 4)
- BSP – string arrangements

Technical personnel

- Graham Sutton – mixing (except track 12), production
- BSP – recording (tracks 4, 9, 10), production, packaging and photos
- Howard Bilerman – recording (except tracks 4, 9 and 10)
- Efrim Menuck – recording (except tracks 4, 9 and 10)
- Jan Scott Wilkinson ("Yan") – mixing (track 12)
- Milos Hajicek – assistant engineering
- Laurence Aldridge – assistant engineering
- Luke Joyse – assistant engineering
- Tim Young – mastering
- Stuart Hawkes – mastering
- Matthew Wood ("Wood") – packaging and photos
- Alison Fielding – packaging and photos
- David Taylor – packaging and photos
- The Outlying Station – sleeve notes

== Chart performance ==
Chart (2008)	Peak position
Dutch Albums (Album Top 100)	97
Irish Albums (IRMA)	37
Scottish Albums (Official Charts)	14
UK Albums (Official Charts)	10
UK Album Downloads (Official Charts)	3
UK Independent Albums (Official Charts)	2
US Heatseekers Albums (Billboard)	5

== Release history ==
Region	Date
United Kingdom	14 January 2008
Australia	9 February 2008
United States	12 February 2008
