= Everything Was Forever =

Studio album by Sea Power
- Released: 18 February 2022
- Length: 46:58
- Label: Golden Chariot
- Producer: Graham Sutton

Sea Power chronology
Disco Elysium (2019)	Everything Was Forever (2022)

Everything Was Forever is a studio album by British indie rock band Sea Power, released on February 18, 2022, on the band's own Golden Chariot label. It was the band's first album in five years, and the first since changing their name from British Sea Power. The songs "Two Fingers" and "Folly" were released as singles.

The album was named after Alexei Yurchak's 2005 book Everything was Forever, Until it was No More: The Last Soviet Generation.

== Production ==
Sea Power began writing songs in late 2019, but this was interrupted by the COVID-19 pandemic and the album was completed in phases. It was influenced by the deaths of Jan and Neil's parents, with the single "Two Fingers" being a tribute to their father. For the first time since 2011's Valhalla Dancehall the band worked with producer Graham Sutton, who determined the final track listing when they could not agree which of the 20 in-progress songs to include.

== Critical reception ==
Professional ratings
Aggregate scores
Source	Rating
Metacritic	79/100
Review scores
Source	Rating
AllMusic	4/5 stars
Under the Radar	8/10 stars
NME	4/5 stars
Pitchfork	7.4/10

Everything Was Forever received generally positive reviews from critics noted at review aggregator Metacritic. It has a weighted average score of 79 out of 100, based on eight reviews. AllMusic called it "as bold and inspired as their best work".

The album was placed 6th in The Quietus album of the year list, and 9th in the end of year list by Louder Than War.

== Chart performance ==
Chart	Peak
UK Albums (OCC)	4
Scottish Albums (OCC)	2

== Track listing ==
No.	Title	Length
1.	"Scaring At The Sky"	4:41
2.	"Transmitter"	4:36
3.	"Two Fingers"	5:40
4.	"Fire Escape In The Sea"	5:42
5.	"Doppelgänger"	4:37
6.	"Fear Eats The Soul"	4:25
7.	"Folly"	4:16
8.	"Green Goddess"	3:18
9.	"Lakeland Echo"	5:36
10.	"We Only Want To Make You Happy"	5:05
