= "O" (Flowers of Hell album) =

Studio album by The Flowers of Hell
- Released: November 9, 2010
- Genre: Absolute music, Experimental
- Length: 45:40
- Label: Optical Sounds
- Producer: Greg Jarvis

The Flowers of Hell chronology
| Come Hell Or High Water (2009) | "O" (2010) | Odes (2012) |

Professional ratings
Review scores
| Source | Rating |
|---|---|
| All Music | 4/5 stars |
| Drowned In Sound | 7/10 stars |
| Eye Weekly | 8/10 stars |
| Now. | 3/5 stars |

"O" is the third studio album from the orchestral rock group The Flowers of Hell. It consists of one song lasting 46 minutes in its stereo mix and 42 minutes in its surround sound mix. The release's liner notes state that the piece is an exploration of band leader Greg Jarvis's synesthesia and was conceived as a piece of absolute music (music with no specific subject matter). It consists of rehearsed improvisations performed with-in a 12 part fixed song structure, recorded in one take at the end of a 9000 km tour. In a 2010 interview with Spinner, Jarvis said that "O" was also designed to explore music's unique capabilities as an art form that unfolds over time.

The album was produced by Jarvis with recording taking place in Toronto with engineer Jon Drew (Stars, Fucked Up). It was mixed in Manchester by Jarvis and fellow synesthete Tom Knott of The Earlies.

"O" was initially released by Optical Sounds on a double sided CD / DVD disc, coupled with a concert film, Live At The Music Gallery.

The Flowers Of Hell performed "O" live as a seated 12 piece with Jarvis conducting at Toronto's Yonge-Dundas Square (now Sankofa Square) as the closing act of the 2011 Intersection Festival of experimental and new classical music.

== Critical reception ==
"O" received favourable ratings from media sources including All Music (4/5), Drowned In Sound (7/10), and Eye Weekly (8/10). ChartAttack declared it, "A tiny step for mankind, but a giant step for orchestral rock." Stooges biographer and former Creem writer Jeffrey Morgan wrote that it rivaled works of Terry Riley, Brian Eno, and Gavin Bryars and, "transport(s) the mind to places records rarely seek to reach these days."

== Cover versions ==
In 2013, Toronto group The Ostrich Tuning released a cover version of "O" titled "Uh", running 46:17.

== Track listing ==
CD Side

1. "O" - Stereo Mix – 45:40

DVD Side

1. "O" - 5.1 Surround Sound Mix - 42:02
2. Live At The Music Gallery - Concert Film - 49:03
3. Special Feature: Opus 66 Animated Video – 3:54
4. Special Feature: Opt Out (Live In Aberdeen) - 10:00
5. Special Feature: Sympathy For Vengeance (Live In Toronto) – 6:01
6. Special Feature: Opt Out (Live In Prague) – 4:25

== Personnel ==
- Greg Jarvis – treated guitar
- Jeremiah Knight – treated guitar
- Ira Zingraff – trumpet
- Regis Pomes – baritone saxophone
- Brian Taylor – flute, organ, tom tom
- Laura C. Bates – violin
- Jennifer Moersch – cello
- Hollie Stevenett – double bass
- Ami Spears – percussion, drums, chimes
