= No Lucifer =

Single by British Sea Power (BSP)

from the album Do You Like Rock Music?
- Released: 10 March 2008
- Genre: Post-punk revival, indie rock
- Length: 3:27
- Label: Rough Trade Records
- Songwriters: Martin Noble, Jan Scott Wilkinson, Neil Hamilton Wilkinson, Matthew Wood
- Producers: BSP & Graham Sutton

British Sea Power (BSP) singles chronology
"Waving Flags" (2008)	"No Lucifer" (2008)	"Waving Flags" (2008)

"No Lucifer" is a 10" single released by rock band British Sea Power on 10 March 2008. It was the second single released from their critically acclaimed third album, Do You Like Rock Music?. The song was written by Hamilton, who also sings on the track. It is the first track written and fronted by Hamilton to be officially released as an A-side single in the UK, although during promotion for Open Season, the track "How Will I Find My Way Home" was intended for single release before being cancelled by the band's record label.

The song opens with the repeated chant "Easy, Easy, Easy...". The band point out in the album sleeve notes that this is in reference to the chant used by fans of the wrestler Big Daddy. Despite the song being deemed accessible enough to be performed on both the David Letterman and the Jools Holland shows the release was limited to only 1000 copies, meaning the single was unable to make an impact on the UK top 40 chart. The song was released with a video which featured performing puppets, which was distributed across the internet through Pitchfork Media. The NME wrote that it is "the best song on the album and worthy of anything on Funeral.", Gigwise gave it a mark of 4 out of 5, and Drowned in Sound deemed it "really dangerously good".

== Track listing ==
1. "No Lucifer" (The Efrim Menuck mix)
2. "Save the Purple House"
3. "Total Confusion"
4. "Charlie Potatoes"
