= The Lonely (British Sea Power song) =

Single by British Sea Power

from the album The Decline of...
- Released: 29 April 2002
- Genre: Indie
- Length: CD – 12:53; 7" – 8:59
- Label: Rough Trade Records
- Songwriters: Martin Noble, Jan Scott Wilkinson, Neil Hamilton Wilkinson, Matthew Wood
- Producer: Mads Bjerke

British Sea Power singles chronology
"Remember Me" (2001)	"The Lonely" (2002)	"Childhood Memories" (2002)

"The Lonely" is a song by British Sea Power. The song was the group's third single and their second on Rough Trade. It was their first single to garner much press coverage and resulted in a chart position. Unusually, the nominal A-side actually featured as the flipside on both versions. The main position is taken by "The Spirit of St. Louis", a tale of Charles Lindbergh's flight across the Atlantic. This is still regularly performed live, despite it only appearing on this release. The title track was written as a tribute to Geoff Goddard, a friend of the band who wrote the 1960s number-one single, "Johnny Remember Me".

The single reached number 76 on the UK Singles Chart.

== Track listings ==
=== CD ===
(RTRADESCD048)

1. "The Spirit of St. Louis" (Yan/BSP) – 3:56
2. "The Lonely" (Yan/BSP) – 5:03
3. "No Red Indian" (Hamilton/BSP) – 3:54

=== 7" Vinyl ===
(RTRADES048)

1. "The Spirit of St. Louis" (Yan/BSP) – 3:56
2. "The Lonely" (Yan/BSP) – 5:03
