= Let the Dancers Inherit the Party =

Studio album by Sea Power
- Released: 31 March 2017
- Length: 48:47
- Labels: Caroline International, Golden Chariot

Sea Power chronology
| Sea of Brass (2015) | Let the Dancers Inherit the Party (2017) | Disco Elysium (2019) |

Professional ratings
Aggregate scores
| Source | Rating |
|---|---|
| Metacritic | 77/100 |
Review scores
| Source | Rating |
| Evening Standard | 4/5 stars |
| The Guardian | 4/5 stars |
| God is in the TV Zine | 9/10 stars |
| Record Collector | 3/5 stars |
| MusicOMH | 4/5 stars |
| PopMatters | 7/10 stars |
| DIY | 4/5 stars |
| Mojo | 4/5 stars |
| Pitchfork Media | 7.3/10 stars |
| Islington Gazette | 4/5 stars |
| Financial Times | 3/5 stars |
| QRO Magazine | 7.6/10 stars |
| Paste | 7.5/10 stars |
| Under the Radar | 7/10 stars |
| Drowned in Sound | 8/10 stars |

Let the Dancers Inherit the Party is a studio album by Sea Power. It was released on 31 March 2017, licensed from the band's own Golden Chariot label to Caroline International.

Recording for the album primarily took place in Brighton at Brighton Electric Recording Studios, with additional recording and mixing at Voltaire Road Studios in Clapham. Early work on the album, including recording and song-writing, was done in diverse locations including Lympne Castle and on Skye.

At the end of 2016, the band ran a crowd-funding campaign to enable them to release the album. Fans paid in advance for a 4-CD box set containing the album along with bonus discs of demos, alternative versions and instrumentals. This box set, in a limited edition of 1000, was distributed at the same time as the regular album.

In early 2017 the songs "Bad Bohemian" and "Keep on Trying (Sechs Freunde)" were released as digital singles, with videos, to promote the album ahead of its release date. "Electrical Kittens" was also made available for streaming shortly before the album's release.

Two vinyl versions of the album were released. The regular one-disc version has slight modifications to the track-listing to balance the timings, while the deluxe two-disc version has an extended version of "Saint Jerome", length 5:35.

== Track listing ==
=== CD ===
| No. | Title | Length |
|---|---|---|
| 1. | "Intro" | 0:29 |
| 2. | "Bad Bohemian" | 3:16 |
| 3. | "International Space Station" | 4:28 |
| 4. | "What You're Doing" | 3:58 |
| 5. | "The Voice of Ivy Lee" | 4:10 |
| 6. | "Keep on Trying (Sechs Freunde)" | 4:15 |
| 7. | "Electrical Kittens" | 5:07 |
| 8. | "Saint Jerome" | 4:35 |
| 9. | "Praise for Whatever" | 5:52 |
| 10. | "Want to Be Free" | 3:47 |
| 11. | "Don't Let the Sun Get in the Way" | 3:39 |
| 12. | "Alone Piano" | 5:11 |

=== CD box set bonus discs ===
Demos
| No. | Title | Length |
|---|---|---|
| 1. | "Intro (demo)" | 0:20 |
| 2. | "Bad Bohemian (demo)" | 3:24 |
| 3. | "International Space Station (demo)" | 4:28 |
| 4. | "What You're Doing (demo)" | 4:32 |
| 5. | "The Voice of Ivy Lee (demo)" | 4:15 |
| 6. | "Keep on Trying (Sechs Freunde) (demo)" | 2:44 |
| 7. | "Electrical Kittens (demo)" | 5:04 |
| 8. | "Saint Jerome (demo)" | 4:24 |
| 9. | "Praise for Whatever (demo)" | 5:47 |
| 10. | "Want to Be Free (demo)" | 3:34 |
| 11. | "Don't Let the Sun Get in the Way (demo)" | 4:57 |
| 12. | "Alone Piano (demo)" | 5:45 |

Alternatives
| No. | Title | Length |
|---|---|---|
| 1. | "Warsaw Choir Gremlins" | 1:56 |
| 2. | "Dog on Dog" | 3:00 |
| 3. | "You Sold Me Down the River" | 4:03 |
| 4. | "Eaves" | 4:18 |
| 5. | "Somewhere" | 0:58 |
| 6. | "Manman" | 2:32 |
| 7. | "South Westerlies" | 3:06 |
| 8. | "She's a Pretty Bird" | 3:21 |
| 9. | "Bonger" | 2:00 |
| 10. | "What You're Doing (radio edit)" | 3:18 |
| 11. | "Matches (extended version)" | 5:35 |
| 12. | "New New World" | 5:54 |
| 13. | "Want to Be Free (remix)" | 4:00 |
| 14. | "The Voice of Ivy Lee (algorithm remix)" | 4:10 |
| 15. | "Don't Let the Sun Get in the Way (ambient mix)" | 4:36 |
| 16. | "Bad Bohemian (William Doyle remix)" | 5:15 |
| 17. | "Alone Piano (restoration)" | 5:23 |

Note

- "Matches" was the placeholder title of Saint Jerome when it appeared on the setlist during the band's 2016 tour dates. This may or may not be a retitling of the extended version of the song that appears on the deluxe vinyl with an identical running time.

Instrumentals
| No. | Title | Length |
|---|---|---|
| 1. | "Intro" | 0:30 |
| 2. | "Bad Bohemian" | 3:21 |
| 3. | "International Space Station" | 4:31 |
| 4. | "What You're Doing" | 4:00 |
| 5. | "The Voice of Ivy Lee" | 4:12 |
| 6. | "Keep on Trying (Sechs Freunde)" | 4:17 |
| 7. | "Electrical Kittens" | 5:08 |
| 8. | "Saint Jerome" | 4:35 (Note: The audio track on the CD lasts 4:35; the tracklisting on the slipcase gives a duration of 5:33.) |
| 9. | "Praise for Whatever" | 5:54 |
| 10. | "Want to Be Free" | 3:48 |
| 11. | "Don't Let the Sun Get in the Way" | 3:38 |
| 12. | "Alone Piano" | 5:08 |

=== Regular vinyl ===
Side one
| No. | Title | Length |
|---|---|---|
| 1. | "Intro" |
| 2. | "Bad Bohemian" |
| 3. | "International Space Station (Edit)" |
| 4. | "What You're Doing" |
| 5. | "The Voice of Ivy Lee" |
| 6. | "Keep on Trying (Sechs Freunde)" |
| 7. | "Want to Be Free" |

Side two
| No. | Title | Length |
|---|---|---|
| 1. | "Saint Jerome" |
| 2. | "Electrical Kittens" |
| 3. | "Praise for Whatever" |
| 4. | "Don't Let the Sun Get in the Way" |
| 5. | "Alone Piano" |

=== Deluxe vinyl ===
Side one
| No. | Title | Length |
|---|---|---|
| 1. | "Intro" |
| 2. | "Bad Bohemian" |
| 3. | "International Space Station" |
| 4. | "What You're Doing" |

Side two
| No. | Title | Length |
|---|---|---|
| 5. | "The Voice of Ivy Lee" |
| 6. | "Keep on Trying (Sechs Freunde)" |
| 7. | "Electrical Kittens" |

Side three
| No. | Title | Length |
|---|---|---|
| 8. | "Saint Jerome (Extended Version)" | 5:35 |
| 9. | "Praise for Whatever" |

Side four
| No. | Title | Length |
|---|---|---|
| 10. | "Want to Be Free" |
| 11. | "Don't Let the Sun Get in the Way" |
| 12. | "Alone Piano" |

== Charts ==
| Chart (2017) | Peak position |
|---|---|
| Scottish Albums (Official Charts) | 18 |
| UK Albums (Official Charts) | 21 |
