= Sea of Brass =

Studio album by British Sea Power
- Released: 30 October 2015
- Genre: Indie rock
- Label: Golden Chariot Records

British Sea Power chronology
From the Sea to the Land Beyond (2013)	Sea of Brass (2015)	Let the Dancers Inherit the Party (2017)

Sea of Brass is a 2015 release by Sea Power (at the time known as "British Sea Power"), featuring a selection of songs from earlier releases re-recorded by the group alongside brass bands.

The recordings originated with British Sea Power's 2014 concerts with a number of brass bands in different places across the UK. The concept and concert tour was also known as 'Sea of Brass'. The band worked with Peter Wraight to arrange songs selected from their back catalogue for brass band.

It was released in a variety of formats and combinations. A primary studio album containing eight tracks was recorded with Foden's Band. An expanded studio album featuring fourteen tracks was released as a double vinyl album. A live recording was made with Redbridge Brass Band at the Barbican Centre in London, a DVD of this recording also being made available. A supplementary CD contains further studio recordings with Foden's Band, recordings featuring only Foden's Band, live tracks performed with Bournemouth Symphony Brass and two recordings of a poem by Jock Scot backed by BSP. These were released variously on CD, DVD, vinyl and download. A deluxe boxset contains all the recordings on CD.

All the releases were made on the band's own Golden Chariot Records label.

== Track listing ==
=== Double vinyl album ===
1. "Heavenly Waters"
2. "Once More Now"
3. "Albert's Eyes"
4. "Atom"
5. "A Light Above Descending"
6. "Machineries Of Joy"
7. "When A Warm Wind Blows Through The Grass"
8. "The Great Skua"
9. "Waving Flags"
10. "No Need To Cry"
11. "The Smallest Church In Sussex"
12. "Lights Out For Darker Skies"
13. "Wooden Horse"
14. "Lately"

=== Triple CD + DVD Boxset ===
==== Studio album ====
1. "Heavenly Waters"
2. "Once More Now"
3. "Albert's Eyes"
4. "Atom"
5. "A Light Above Descending"
6. "Machineries Of Joy"
7. "When A Warm Wind Blows Through The Grass"
8. "The Great Skua"

==== Live CD ====
1. "Heavenly Waters"
2. "A Wooden Horse"
3. "Albert's Eyes"
4. "Atom"
5. "No Need To Cry"
6. "Once More Now"
7. "The Smallest Church In Sussex"
8. "Machineries Of Joy"
9. "A Light Above Descending"
10. "Lately"
11. "Lights Out For Darker Skies"
12. "Waving Flags"
13. "The Great Skua"
14. "When A Warm Wind Blows Through The Grass"

==== Supplementary CD ====
1. "Waving Flags" (Brass-only Orchestral Version)
2. "Lights Out For Darker Skies"
3. "No Need To Cry"
4. "A Wooden Horse"
5. "Waving Flags"
6. "The Smallest Church In Sussex"
7. "Lately"
8. "Albert's Eyes" (Brass-only Orchestral Version)
9. "Someone's Yearning" (Studio Version)
10. "Once More Now" (Brass-only Orchestral Version)
11. "True Adventures" (live at All Saints Church, Hove)
12. "What You Need The Most" (live at All Saints Church, Hove)
13. "Blackout" (live at All Saints Church, Hove)
14. "Bear" (live at All Saints Church, Hove)
15. "Heavenly Waters" (Brass-only Orchestral Version)
16. "Waving Flags Two" (Brass-only Orchestral Version)
17. "Someone's Yearning" (live at The Barbican, London)
18. "The Great Skua" (Brass-only Orchestral Version)

==== Live DVD ====
1. "Heavenly Waters"
2. "A Wooden Horse"
3. "Albert's Eyes"
4. "Atom"
5. "Someone's Yearning"
6. "No Need To Cry"
7. "Once More Now"
8. "The Smallest Church In Sussex"
9. "Machineries Of Joy"
10. "A Light Above Descending"
11. "Lately"
12. "Lights Out For Darker Skies"
13. "Waving Flags"
14. "The Great Skua"
15. "When A Warm Wind Blows Through The Grass"
