= Zeus (EP) =

EP by British Sea Power
- Released: 4 October 2010
- Recorded: Selmeston and Isle of Skye in 2010
- Genre: Post-punk revival Indie rock
- Length: 42:42
- Label: Rough Trade
- Producer: BSP & Graham Sutton

British Sea Power EP chronology
Krankenhaus? (2007)	Zeus (2010)	Valhalla V.I.P. (2011)

Zeus is an EP by the band British Sea Power. It was released on 4 October 2010 in the UK.

The EP, and its title track, are named after the transit van used by the band, according to singer and guitarist Yan.

The band's merchandise stand at concerts also sold their own brand of beer named "Zeus".

Contradictory to the appearance of their names, the track "Mongk" is a remix of the song "Mongk II", which was written earlier but released later. Both "Mongk II" and "Cleaning Out The Rooms" appeared on the Valhalla Dancehall album, released a few months after Zeus.

The EP artwork is strongly inspired by a London Underground poster designed by Kathleen Stenning in 1925.

== Track listing ==
1. "Zeus" – 7:02
2. "Cleaning Out The Rooms" – 7:11
3. "Can We Do It?" – 2:50
4. "Bear" – 5:56
5. "Pardon My Friends" – 2:35
6. "Mongk" – 4:57
7. "kW·h" – 3:22
8. "Retreat" (Bonus Track) – 8:49

== Release history ==
Region	Date	Label	Format	Catalog number
United Kingdom	4 October 2010	Rough Trade Records	CD	RTRADSCD593
United Kingdom	4 October 2010	Rough Trade Records	12"	-
