= It Ended on an Oily Stage =

Single by British Sea Power

from the album Open Season
- Released: 21 March 2005
- Genre: Indie
- Length: CD – 9:46; E-CD – 9:50; 7" – 7:11
- Label: Rough Trade Records
- Songwriters: Martin Noble, Jan Scott Wilkinson, Neil Hamilton Wilkinson, Matthew Wood
- Producer: Mads Bjerke

British Sea Power singles chronology
"A Lovely Day Tomorrow" (2004)	"It Ended on an Oily Stage" (2005)	"Please Stand Up" (2005)

"It Ended on an Oily Stage" was the first published single from British Sea Power's second album Open Season. It reached number 18 in the UK Singles Chart and was critically praised, with the NME giving it their Track of the Week award. It received heavy airplay from the alternative radio sector. This track was previously called "Elegiac Stanzas" but was renamed when the band questioned whether radio presenters would be able to pronounce it.

== Track listings ==
=== Cd (rtradscd220) ===
1. "It Ended on an Oily Stage" (BSP) – 4:23
2. "Green Grass of Tunnel" (Gunnar Tynes/Kristín Anna Valtýsdóttir/Gyda Valtýsdóttir/Örvar Smârason) – 5:23

=== E-CD (RTRADSCDX220) ===
1. "It Ended on an Oily Stage" (BSP) – 4:23
2. "When I Go Out (from the Evangeline sessions)" (Yan) – 2:44
3. "Crystal Horse" (Hamilton/BSP) – 2:43

Also features the promo video for "It Ended on an Oily Stage" as a CD-ROM extra.

=== 7" Vinyl (RTRADS220) ===
1. "It Ended on an Oily Stage" (BSP) – 4:23
2. "Don't You Want to Be a Bird?" (Hamilton/BSP) – 2:48
