= Krankenhaus? =

EP by British Sea Power
- Released: 8 October 2007 (UK) 9 October 2007 (US)
- Genre: Indie
- Length: 24:33
- Label: Rough Trade
- Producers: BSP & Graham Sutton

British Sea Power EP chronology
The Spirit of St. Louis (2004)	Krankenhaus? (2007)	Zeus (2010)

Professional ratings
Review scores
Source	Rating
Pitchfork Media	(7.3/10)

Krankenhaus? (German for "Hospital?") is an EP by the band British Sea Power. It was released digitally on 8 October 2007 in the UK and on 9 October 2007 in the US. It was released in CD format on 20 November 2007. The EP contains two videos, one a live video of the previously released track "The Spirit of St. Louis", the other an experimental video called "Water Tower".

"Down On The Ground" and the full version of "Atom" will both feature on British Sea Power's forthcoming third album, Do You Like Rock Music?. "The track Atom," says British Sea Power singer Yan, "is about when all the protons, neutrons, electrons and morons get torn from atomic equilibrium to fly around and confuse us. It's kind of about how over analysis leads to more questions than answers, whether with relationships or quantum theory. Apparently, humans are the only animals that can ask 'why'. But, personal experience tells us that doesn't necessarily go hand in hand with understanding 'how'. As it cums in the song, 'I just don't get it.'"

The short film "Water Tower" was shot at the derelict Suffolk water tower where British Sea Power recorded some of the album. The live video of "The Spirit Of St Louis" was filmed at the London Forum in November 2005.

== Track listing ==
1. Atom (Edit) – 4:40
2. Down on the Ground – 4:31
3. Straight Down the Line – 4:06
4. Hearing Aid – 1:56
5. The Pelican – 9:20
