= A Lovely Day Tomorrow =

Single by British Sea Power
- Released: 17 April 2004
- Genre: Indie
- Length: CD – 13:11
- Label: Rough Trade Records (trading as Rough Trade Bohemia)
- Songwriter(s): Martin Noble, Jan Scott Wilkinson, Neil Hamilton Wilkinson, Matthew Wood

British Sea Power singles chronology
"Remember Me" (2003)	"A Lovely Day Tomorrow" (2004)	"It Ended on an Oily Stage" (2005)

"A Lovely Day Tomorrow" is a 2004 single by British Sea Power, only released to shops in the Czech Republic but available at certain shows and via mail order in the United Kingdom. It is a re-recording of an early B-side by the band (from the "Remember Me" single).

The B-side "Zítra Bude Krásný Den" is a version of the song translated into Czech. Both versions of the song feature lead vocals by Kateřina Winterová of Ecstasy of Saint Theresa. Whilst the original plan had been to teach original vocalist, Hamilton, the Czech lyrics it was thought to be easier to recruit someone else. The song deals with the assassination of Reinhard Heydrich by two Czechoslovak agents during World War II. To celebrate the entry of Czech Republic into the European Union it was decided to put out this release as a limited edition of 1,942 copies (the year the operation took place). The two bands also played special shows at Prague's club Roxy and London's Cargo club, and BSP gained a sponsorship deal with Budvar beer.

"Fakir" is not a traditional Czech song - it is rather unknown to Czech listeners. It was written and performed in the 1940s by the Czech hitmakers of the swing era - R.A. Dvorsky and his Melody Boys. The song was recommended to BSP by Jan P. Muchow, the guitarist of Ecstasy of Saint Theresa.

== Track listing ==
=== CD (RTRADSCD179) ===
1. "A Lovely Day Tomorrow" (Hamilton/BSP) – 5:01
2. "Zítra Bude Krásný Den" (Hamilton/BSP) – 5:01
3. "Fakir" (Svojík/Fořt - traditional folk song) – 3:08
