= Waving Flags =

Single by British Sea Power

from the album Do You Like Rock Music?
- Released: 7 January 2008
- Genre: Post-punk revival, indie rock
- Label: Rough Trade Records
- Songwriters: Martin Noble, Jan Scott Wilkinson, Neil Hamilton Wilkinson, Matthew Wood
- Producers: BSP & Graham Sutton

British Sea Power singles chronology
"Remember Me/I Am a Cider Drinker" (2005)	"Waving Flags" (2008)	"No Lucifer" (2008)
No Lucifer (2008)	Waving Flags (2008)	Living Is So Easy (2010)

"Waving Flags" is the first single to be released from British Sea Power's third studio album Do You Like Rock Music?. It was released on 7 January 2008 (UK) in CD and Vinyl format, as well being available as a digital download. It entered the UK Singles Chart at number 31, and the BBC Radio 1 Independent Label Singles chart at number one. The song was re-released in September 2008 to coincide with their Mercury Music Prize nomination.

The track can also be heard on E4's Skins where it plays out the Franky episode from Series 5 as well as on an episode of Ted Lasso on Apple TV+.

== Track listings ==
=== CD ===
1. "Waving Flags"
2. "Everybody Must Be Saved"

=== 7" Vinyl 1 ===
1. "Waving Flags"
2. "Ooby Dooby Doo"

=== 7" Vinyl 2 ===
1. "Waving Flags (Wandering Horn Instrumental)"
2. "Elizabeth and Susan Meet the Pelican"

=== Digital download ===
1. "Waving Flags (Single Version)"
2. "Waving Flags (Hotel 2 Tango Demo Version)"
3. "Waving Flags (White Mischief Live Version)"
