= Carrion/Apologies to Insect Life =

2003 single by Sea Power

Single by Sea Power

from the album The Decline of...
- Released: 30 June 2003
- Recorded: Unknown
- Genre: Indie
- Length: CD 1 – 13:31; CD 2 – 10:45; 7" – 6:58
- Label: Rough Trade Records
- Songwriter(s): Martin Noble, Jan Scott Wilkinson, Neil Hamilton Wilkinson, Matthew Wood (both songs)
- Producer(s): Mads Bjerke

Sea Power singles chronology
"Childhood Memories" (2002)	"Carrion" / "Apologies to Insect Life" (2003)	"Remember Me" (2003)

"Carrion"/"Apologies to Insect Life" is a double A-side single by Sea Power. Both songs feature on their debut album, The Decline of British Sea Power, and this was the first single to be issued after its release. Reaching No. 36 in the UK, the single received rave reviews and was the band's first Top 40 hit. Despite videos being made for both tracks and the nature of the release, most of the airplay and coverage was given to "Carrion", the more pop-oriented song, which is considered by many fans to be one of the band's defining tracks. Some of its lyrics adorn the walls of the National Maritime museum in London. "Apologies to Insect Life" is far more angular and has obvious post-punk influences. 1,942 copies were issued of the 7", each individually named with a British coastal feature. Two different mixes of both songs appear across the releases. The Commander's Croft version of "Carrion" is the one featured on the album.

== Track listings ==
=== Disk 1 (RTRADESCD092) ===
1. "Carrion (Commander's Croft mix)" (BSP) – 4:04
2. "Apologies to Insect Life" (BSP) – 2:51
3. "Heavenly Waters" (Hamilton/BSP) – 6:36

=== Disk 2 (RTRADESCD092X) ===
1. "Carrion (Ridgeway mix)" (BSP) – 4:07
2. "Apologies to Insect Life (Russian Rock demo)" (BSP) – 3:02
3. "Albert's Eyes" (Yan/BSP) – 3:36

=== 7" Vinyl (RTRADES092) ===
1. "Carrion (Ridgeway mix)" (BSP) – 4:07
2. "Apologies to Insect Life" (BSP) – 2:51
