= The Decline of British Sea Power =

Studio album by British Sea Power
- Released: 2 June 2003
- Recorded: 2003 at 2 kHz, et al.
- Genres: Indie rock, post-punk revival
- Length: 47:15
- Label: Rough Trade

British Sea Power chronology
The Decline of British Sea Power (2003)	Open Season (2005)

Singles from The Decline of British Sea Power
- 1. "Fear of Drowning" Released: 2001; 2. "Remember Me" Released: 2001; 3. "The Lonely" Released: 2002; 4. "Carrion/Apologies to Insect Life" Released: 2003; 5. "Remember Me (re-issue)" Released: 2003

Professional ratings
Aggregate scores
Source	Rating
Metacritic	86/100
Review scores
Source	Rating
AllMusic	4.5/5 stars
Blender	4/5 stars
Entertainment Weekly	A
The Guardian	4/5 stars
Mojo	4/5 stars
NME	8/10
Pitchfork	7.7/10
Q	4/5 stars
Rolling Stone	3/5 stars
Uncut	4/5 stars

The Decline of British Sea Power is the debut studio album by English indie rock band Sea Power, then known as "British Sea Power", released on 2 June 2003. "The Lonely", "Carrion" and "Remember Me" were all released as singles from the album, as well as older recordings of "Fear of Drowning" and "Remember Me", which differ from the versions on this album.

The quotation on the album art is paraphrased from the final line of the American novel The Bridge of San Luis Rey by Thornton Wilder.

== Track listing ==
1. "Men Together Today" – 0:41
2. "Apologies to Insect Life" (Hamilton/Noble/Wood/Yan) – 2:47
3. "Favours in the Beetroot Fields" (Yan) – 1:16
4. "Something Wicked" (Hamilton) – 3:12
5. "Remember Me" (Yan) – 3:10
6. "Fear of Drowning" (Yan) – 4:26
7. "The Lonely" (Yan) – 5:12
8. "Carrion" (Hamilton/Noble/Wood/Yan) – 4:06
9. "Blackout" (Hamilton) – 3:48
10. "Lately" (Yan) – 13:58
11. "A Wooden Horse" (Yan) – 4:37

=== Japanese bonus tracks ===
12. "Heavenly Waters" (Hamilton) – 6:35
13. "Childhood Memories" (Yan) – 3:36

=== American bonus tracks ===
12. "Childhood Memories" (Yan) – 3:36
13. "Heavenly Waters" (Hamilton) – 6:35

=== Anniversary reissue bonus discs ===
THE DECLINE-ERA B-SIDES

1. "Albert’s Eyes"
2. "Moley & Me"
3. "The Smallest Church In Sussex"
4. "Salty Water"
5. "Strange Communication"
6. "Birdy"
7. "Heavenly Waters"
8. "A Lovely Day Tomorrow"
9. "Apologies To Insect Life" (Russian Rock Demo)
10. "The Scottish Wildlife Experience"
11. "No Red Indian"
12. "Good Good Boys"

THE DECLINE ERA, RARE AND LIVE

1. "Carrion" (concert intro loop)
2. "Childhood Memories" (single)
3. "Remember Me" (Gareth Jones mix)
4. "Carrion" (Mads Bjerke mix)
5. "A Lovely Day Tomorrow" (Will Sergeant)
6. "Strange"
7. "Tugboat"
8. "A Wooden Horse" (Golden Chariot B-side)
9. "Fear Of Drowning" (Golden Chariot single)
10. "The Spirit Of St Louis" (single)
11. "Out Of My Mind On Dope And Speed"
12. "A Lovely Day Tomorrow" (Czech EP alternative)
13. "Fakir" (Czech EP)
14. "The Smallest Church In Sussex" (instrumental)
15. "Fear Of Drowning" (Club Sea Power)
16. "The Scottish Wildlife Experience" (Club Sea Power)
17. "The Spirit Of St Louis" (Club Sea Power)
18. "Lately" (Club Sea Power)

THE DECLINE-ERA DEMO RECORDINGS

1. "We’re Not Like This" (Monnow Valley)
2. "Memories Of Childhood"
3. "The Lonely" (organ demo)
4. "Albert’s Eyes"
5. "Heavenly Waters" (vocal demo)
6. "The Smallest Church In Sussex" (piano)
7. "A Lovely Day Tomorrow"
8. "Something Wicked" (Hamilton vocal)
9. "Black Ops With Liberace" ("The Lonely" (demo))
10. "Always The Sea" (Monnow Valley)
11. "Blackout"
12. "Lately"
13. "The Spirit Of St Louis"
14. "Theme From Baraka"
15. "Total War By Rock And Roll"
16. Unused demo 1
17. Unused demo 9
18. Unused demo 3
19. Unused demo 7
20. "Diecastings"

== Personnel ==
=== Sea Power ===
- Yan (Scott Wilkinson) – lead vocals, guitar, piano, organ
- Hamilton (Neil Hamilton Wilkinson) – bass, guitar, piano, organ, backing vocals; lead vocals on "Blackout"
- Noble (Martin Noble) – guitar, piano, backing vocals, organ
- Wood (Matthew Wood) – drums

=== Additional ===
- D. Sharp – French horn on "Blackout"
- M. J. Noble – extra backing vocals on "Men Together Today" and "Blackout"
- V. Oag – recorded sea on "Fear of Drowning"

=== Recording ===
All songs recorded by Mads Bjerke and British Sea Power at 2 kHz. Excepting "Carrion", recorded at Golden Chariot Studios, Roundhouse and 2 kHz and, with Marc Beatty, at Mockingbird Studio. "Carrion" mixed at The Townhouse by Dave Bascombe.

== Release history ==
Region	Date	Label	Format	Catalog number
United Kingdom	2 June 2003	Rough Trade Records	CD	RTRADECD090
United Kingdom	2 June 2003	Rough Trade Records	LP	RTRADELP090
Japan	20 August 2003	Toy's Factory	CD	TFCK-87329
United States	9 September 2003		CD	06076-83214-2
