= Childhood Memories (song) =

Single by British Sea Power
- Released: 4 November 2002
- Recorded: Unknown
- Genre: Indie
- Length: CD – 9:01; 7" – 7:42
- Label: Rough Trade Records
- Songwriter(s): Martin Noble, Jan Scott Wilkinson, Neil Hamilton Wilkinson, Matthew Wood
- Producer(s): Mads Bjerke

British Sea Power singles chronology
"The Lonely" (2002)	"Childhood Memories" (2002)	"Carrion/Apologies to Insect Life" (2003)

"Childhood Memories" was the fourth single to be released by British Sea Power. Despite its low chart position and not being included on any album (reducing the numbers who know the song), it is a live favourite and it still appears occasionally in the band's setlists. The lyrics contrast with childlike structure of the music, dealing with the meltdown of a Nuclear power plant. This track was previously known as "Memories of Childhood!".Acoustic guitar and keyboards are prominent throughout the track. The 7" release was wrongly labeled as having "Favours in the Beetroot Fields" as the flipside, whereas it is actually "Strange Communication". It peaked at a lowly number 90 on the UK Singles Chart.

== Track listings ==
1. "Childhood Memories" (Yan/BSP) – 3:35
2. "Favours in the Beetroot Fields" (Yan/BSP) – 1:19
3. "Strange Communication" (Yan/BSP) – 4:07

=== 7" Vinyl (RTRADES069) ===
1. "Childhood Memories" (Yan/BSP) – 3:35
2. "Strange Communication" (Yan/BSP) – 4:07
