= Phil Sumner =

Phil Sumner is a cornet, keyboard and guitar player for the Kendal/Brighton-based rock band Sea Power originally from Shrewsbury. Previous bands include Brighton/Stroud-based rock band Actress Hands, and appearances on record with Electric Soft Parade.

== British Sea Power ==
He first emerged with Sea Power on their September 2006 tour in which they first performed songs which would appear on their critically acclaimed 3rd album Do you like Rock Music?. He has since become a permanent replacement for previous keyboard player Eamon Hamilton who left to front Brighton-based rock band Brakes. His cornet playing however marks a new sound for the band.

On the release tour for Do You Like Rock Music? in January 2008, Sumner made musical headlines for an attempted stage dive at the Leeds Irish Centre which resulted in him being knocked unconscious and hospitalised. The band carried on performing during the spectacle, while many in the audience were visibly shocked and concerned for Sumner. Despite his injury Sumner performed with the band the very next day in their home town, Kendal. Sumner carried on a running tradition of eccentrically caused injury in the band, with previous incidents on tour including bass player and singer Hamilton breaking his arm after cutting off the branch he was sitting on, while looking for stage decoration.
