= Valhalla Dancehall =

Studio album by British Sea Power
- Released: 10 January 2011
- Genres: Alternative rock, indie rock
- Length: 60:31
- Label: Rough Trade
- Producers: BSP & Graham Sutton

British Sea Power chronology
Man of Aran (2009)	Valhalla Dancehall (2011)	Machineries of Joy (2013)

Professional ratings
Review scores
Source	Rating
AllMusic	3.5/5 stars
BBC	(positive)
CrackleFeedback	8/10 stars
Entertainment.ie	3/5 stars
Gigwise	4.5/5 stars
The Guardian	4/5 stars
Pitchfork Media	5.5/10 stars
Rockfeedback	3./5 stars
Spin	6/10 stars
This Is Fake DIY	9/10 stars

Valhalla Dancehall is a studio album from the Brighton-based indie rock band British Sea Power. It was released in 10 January 2011.

The album's title was revealed on 13 October 2010. The band's official website displayed a release date of 10 January. The Canadian website of their record label listed a release date of 18 January.

The first single from the album, "Living Is So Easy", was released digitally on 29 November 2010.

The album was recorded in South East England and on the Isle of Skye, and produced by British Sea Power and Graham Sutton.

The song "Georgie Ray" was inspired by George Orwell and Ray Bradbury, according to Yan and Wood in an interview with musicOMH.

The song "Cleaning Out The Rooms" first appeared on the Zeus EP, as did a different version of "Mongk II" entitled "Mongk".

Regarding the album's title, the band have merely stated that "Valhalla Dancehall" is possibly "just a glorified farmhouse that sometimes runs out of oil."

== Track listing ==
Valhalla Dancehall
No.	Title	Writer(s)	Length
1.	"Who’s In Control"	Noble/Yan	3:14
2.	"We Are Sound"	Noble/Yan	4:47
3.	"Georgie Ray"	Yan	3:48
4.	"Stunde Null"	Yan	2:39
5.	"Mongk II"	Hamilton	4:49
6.	"Luna"	Yan	4:17
7.	"Baby"	Hamilton	5:47
8.	"Living Is So Easy"	Noble/Yan/Hamilton	4:01
9.	"Observe The Skies"	Noble/Yan/Sumner	3:23
10.	"Cleaning Out The Rooms"	Hamilton	7:11
11.	"Thin Black Sail"	Noble/Yan	1:46
12.	"Once More Now"	Hamilton	11:14
13.	"Heavy Water"	BSP	3:42
Total length:			60:31

== Valhalla V.I.P. EP ==
Independent record stores in the UK sold initial copies of the album with an additional EP, entitled Valhalla V.I.P..

Valhalla V.I.P.
No.	Title	Writer(s)	Length
1.	"Let The Tears Roll"	Hamilton/Noble	4:06
2.	"Lucky Bicycle"	Yan/Hamilton/Noble/Wood	2:45
3.	"kW-h (Glitter)" (Remix of the version on the Zeus EP)	Yan	5:24
4.	"Shit Factory"	Yan	2:01
5.	"Luna" (Full Length Version)	Yan	9:32
Total length:			23:48
