= White Mischief (festival) =

White Mischief is a steampunk-themed indoor festival, first organized in London in 2007.

== Around the World in 80 Days ==
Around the World in 80 Days.

White Mischief's 2008 event was held at the Scala nightclub in London. Performers included:

- Oojami, a global band who combine Turkish influences with London beats and Sufi dancers;
- Tough Love, co-founders and hosts of White Mischief, this six-piece pop band blends tribal, world-influenced drums and percussion with quirky, acerbic English lyrics;
- Hooligan Night, formed in 2006 when production maestro Nik Diezel met apocalyptic pin-up Ruby Blues, one of the superstars of the London neo-burlesque scene;
- Aste Amundsen, the artist behind The Apocalypse Gameshow;
- The Penny Dreadfuls, a Neo-Victorian comedy troupe;
- Miss Behave
- Ebony Bones
- The Outside Royalty, a six-piece "electro chamber rock" band;
- Tricity Vogue, a vintage Jazz singer;
- Dusty Limits
- Ophelia Bitz
- Seffi, Snake Charmer
- Ta Mere
- Todd Hart
- Scratchy
- Lady Kamikaze
- The Men That Will Not Be Blamed for Nothing
- Dickon Edwards
- The Broken Hearts
- Sheriff Marshall Lawman and Theodora Goes Wild
