= Remember Me (Sea Power song) =

Single by Sea Power
- Released: 3 December 2001
- Genre: Post-punk; power pop
- Length: CD – 11:19; 7" – 7:40
- Label: Rough Trade
- Songwriter(s): Martin Noble, Jan Scott Wilkinson, Neil Hamilton Wilkinson, Matthew Wood
- Producer(s): Mads Bjerke

Sea Power singles chronology
"Fear of Drowning" (2001)	"Remember Me" (2001)	"The Lonely" (2002)
"Carrion"/"Apologies to Insect Life" (2003)	"Remember Me" (re-release) (2003)	A Lovely Day Tomorrow (2004)

"Remember Me" is a song by Sea Power, released in 2001 as their second single and the first released after signing to Rough Trade Records. "Remember Me" the first track to be recorded with long-time producer Mads Bjerke.

Jan Scott Wilkinson stated in an interview that the lyrics are about "mortality and stuff", but also that the inspiration for the song came from brother, and then manager of the band, Roy Wilkinson developing a boil due to stress that would get larger the more he worried about it.

"Remember Me" was re-recorded for the debut album, The Decline of British Sea Power. The version from The Decline of British Sea Power was also released as its final single in 2003 and reached number 30 in the UK Singles Chart. B-side "A Lovely Day Tomorrow" was also re-recorded three years later and released as a limited edition single. In 2013, "Remember Me" was voted no. 9 in the BBC 6Music Top 100 songs.

== Track listings ==
=== CD (rtradescd032) ===
1. "Remember Me" (Yan/BSP) – 3:36
2. "A Lovely Day Tomorrow" (Hamilton/BSP) – 4:04
3. "Birdy" (Yan/BSP) – 3:39

=== 7" vinyl (RTRADES032) ===
1. "Remember Me" (Yan/BSP) – 3:36
2. "A Lovely Day Tomorrow" (Hamilton/BSP) – 4:04

=== CD (rtradescd125) ===
1. "Remember Me" (Yan/BSP) – 3:10
2. "Salty Water" (Yan/BSP) – 3:52
3. "Good Good Boys" (Hamilton/BSP) – 3:46

=== CD (rtradescd126) ===
1. "Remember Me" (Yan/BSP) – 3:10
2. "Moley & Me" (Hamilton/BSP) – 4:09
3. "The Smallest Church In Sussex" (Hamilton/BSP) – 2:54

=== 7" vinyl (RTRADES125) ===
1. "Remember Me" (Yan/BSP) – 3:10
2. "The Scottish Wildlife Experience" (BSP) – 2:56
