= Abi Fry =

English musician and composer

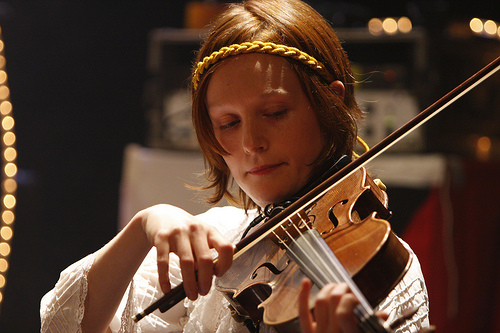
Abi Fry playing with Sea Power in Paris in 2008.

Abigail Helen Fry (born 1981) is an English violist and Bafta award-winning composer. She plays with various acts including Sea Power, Bat for Lashes, The Flowers of Hell, Sad Season and Euchrid Eucrow. Fry grew up in Ealing, West London and resides in the Scottish Highlands and Brighton.

In 2007 Fry toured extensively with Bat for Lashes including Europe and the United States. On 4 September 2007 she played with the band at the Mercury Prize finals in London. Bat for Lashes had been the bookmakers' early favourite to win the prize, but it was awarded to Klaxons.

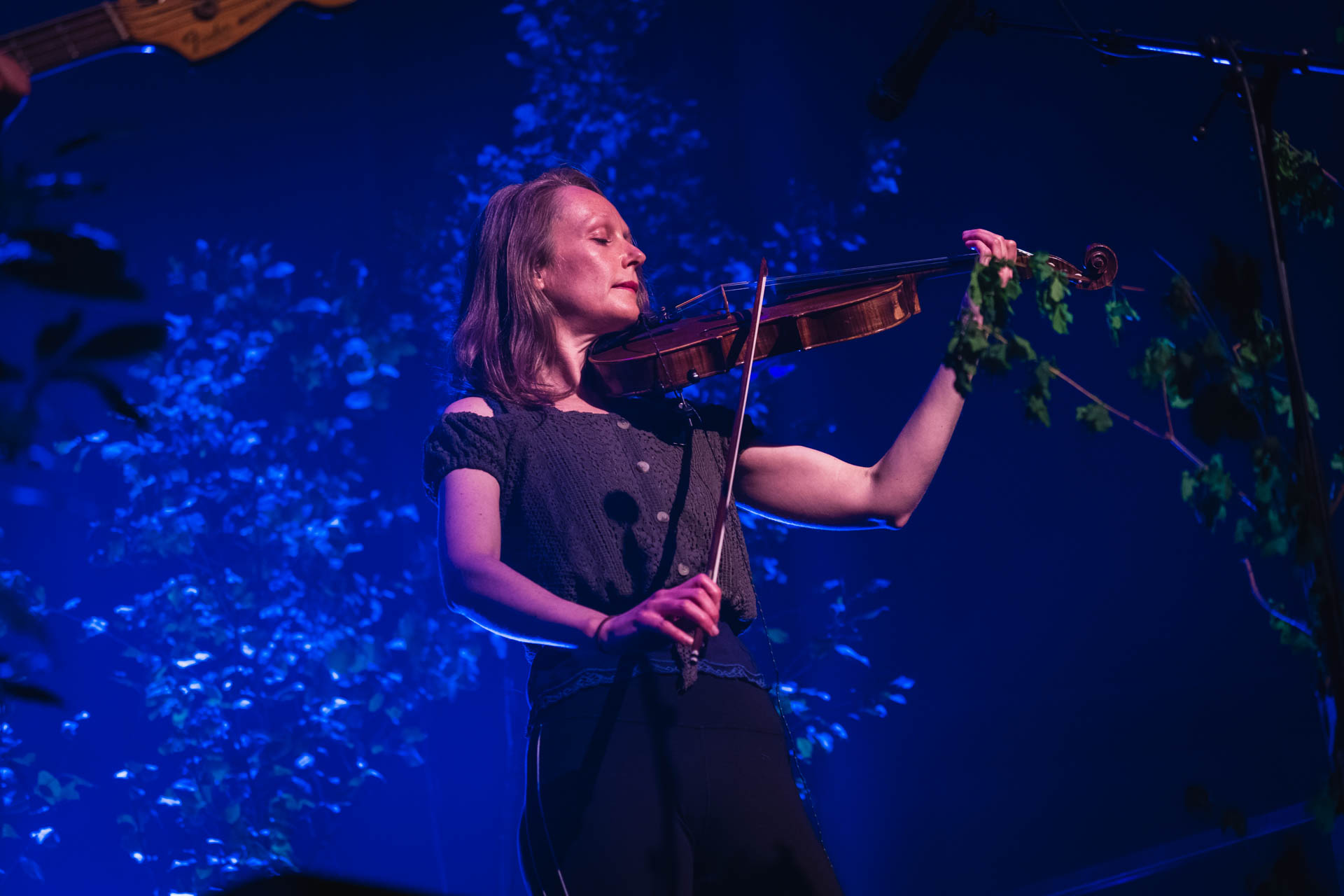
Abi Fry (playing with Sea Power in 2022)

Fry's last concert with Bat for Lashes was on 29 October 2007 at Koko in London, since when she has become a permanent member of Sea Power.

From February to May 2008, while touring with Sea Power in North America, she also joined sometime opening act Jeffrey Lewis on stage – adding viola arrangements to his acoustic guitar-based performances.

In 2011 Fry performed live with Pulp at a festival in Poland, as a temporary replacement for Russell Senior, absent due to his fear of flying.

Fry plays violin on the album Awoken Broken by progressive metal supergroup, Primal Rock Rebellion.
