= Sea Power =

English rock band

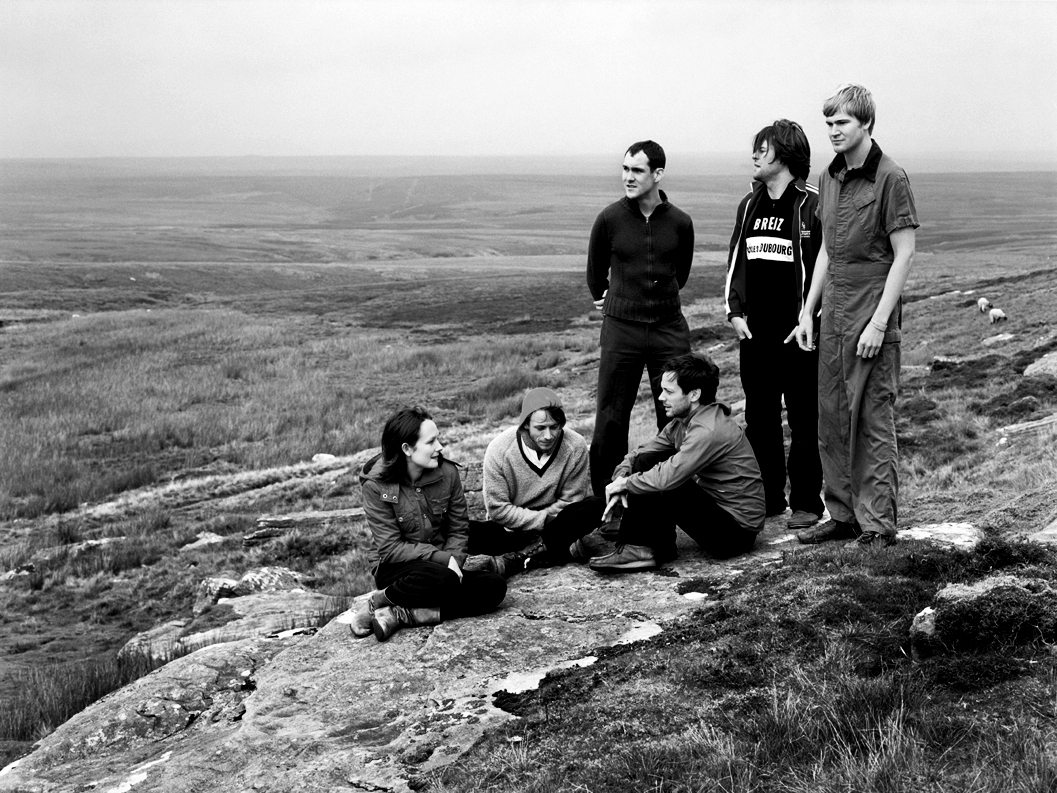
- Sea Power in 2009

Background information
- Also known as: British Air Powers; British Sea Power; BSP
- Origin: Reading, Berkshire, England
- Genres: Indie rock; post-punk revival; post-rock
- Years active: 1995–present
- Labels: Golden Chariot; Caroline; Rough Trade
- Members: Yan Scott Wilkinson; Neil Hamilton Wilkinson; Martin Noble; Phil Sumner; Abi Fry; Tom White
- Past members: Eamon Hamilton; Alison Cotton; Matthew Wood
- Website: seapowerband.com

Sea Power, previously known as British Sea Power and initially as British Air Powers, are an English alternative rock band. The group's original lineup consisted of Jan Scott Wilkinson, known as Yan; Martin Noble, known as Noble; and Alison Cotton. By the time the band had begun its recording career, Cotton had departed, and two new members had joined: Neil Hamilton Wilkinson, known as Hamilton, and Matthew Wood, known as Wood. Eamon Hamilton joined the band in autumn 2002. He left in 2006 and was replaced by Phil Sumner, with Abi Fry joining the band in 2008.

The wide-ranging nature of the band's material has led critics to liken their sound to a variety of groups, from The Cure and Joy Division to Pixies and Arcade Fire.

== History ==
=== Early years and The Decline of British Sea Power (1995–2003) ===
British Sea Power's Yan and (Neil) Hamilton are brothers and were school friends with Wood near Natland in Kendal, Cumbria. They were in a number of bands together while at school, but after finishing his exams Yan moved to study at the University of Reading, where he met guitarist Noble, who was originally from Bury, Greater Manchester.

In 1995, Yan and Noble were looking to start a band together; they recruited fellow student Alison Cotton via advertisements on the university's notice board, and the trio began performing together, initially under the name British Air Powers. (Neil) Hamilton and Wood moved to Reading and joined the group shortly thereafter. Cotton was "headhunted" by Adam Cresswell and Mike Smoughton of local band Saloon in the late 90s, and left British Air Powers before they began their recording career.

The group played gigs and produced a four-track demo in Reading as British Air Powers, before relocating to Brighton in search of a more active music scene. "British Sea Power" was actually the name of one of these demo tracks, and was eventually reworked as "Carrion". In Brighton, BSP amassed a strong local following, due mainly to their own club night called "Club Sea Power" which was hosted at the Freebutt and Lift clubs. The club nights featured many support acts, including the Copper Family, a 200-year-old Sussex folk troupe and other forms of entertainment such as a 1940s fashion show.

Their first single, "Fear of Drowning", was issued in limited numbers on their own Golden Chariot label. The artwork for the B side, "A Wooden Horse", borrows heavily from the dust cover of the 1950 book The Wooden Horse that details the escape of Allied POWs during World War II. Geoff Travis of Rough Trade Records, impressed by seeing the band live, signed them to his label in September 2001. Originally a four-piece, Eamon Hamilton was recruited to play keyboards and bass drum in autumn 2002.

The Decline of British Sea Power, the band's first album, was released in June 2003 to critical acclaim. A single from the album, "Carrion", became the band's first Top 40 single. The album charted in the lower reaches of the UK Album Chart.

=== Open Season (2004–2006) ===
The follow-up, Open Season, was released in early April 2005, and also enjoyed wide critical praise. It showcased a more accessible, produced sound and charted at No. 13 in the UK Albums Chart. The lead single, "It Ended on an Oily Stage", charted at No. 18 in the UK Singles Chart a week earlier.

British Sea Power had won the 2004 Time Out Live Band of the Year award and by this time had built a reputation for elaborate and well-thought out live shows. Stages were often decorated with foliage and plastic birds and shows would generally finish with a semi-improvised song called "Rock in A", which sometimes lasted for over 20 minutes. Various members would climb riggings and tear down the foliage, while Eamon would walk around the audience beating his marching drum. The encore would sometimes see an eight-foot bear, Ursine Ultra, join in the performance.

The stage antics have become one of the signatures of the band. Another is their choice of venues. Their tours have often included unusual locations such as the Scillonian Club on the Isles of Scilly, Grasmere Village Hall, the Czech Embassy in London and Carnglaze Caverns in Cornwall. They have also played in museums, libraries and sea forts.

The band has built up an eccentric image in interviews and press releases. This has included giving journalists grid references at which to meet them, and expressing obsessions with Field Marshal Montgomery and bird watching. Similarly, they appeared on the TV show Countryfile in which they discussed their love of the countryside and played an outdoor performance of the track "Canvey Island".

At the beginning of 2006, it was announced that Eamon had left British Sea Power to concentrate on his own band Brakes.

=== Do You Like Rock Music? and Man of Aran (2007–2009) ===
In October 2007, the band toured the East Coast of the United States, showcasing their new 5-track EP Krankenhaus?. Their November 2007 tour of the UK included a seaside café in Saltdean (East Sussex, England), a River Mersey ferry (Liverpool, England), All Saints' Church (Newcastle upon Tyne, England) and White Mischief's Around the World in 80 Days indoor bands/vaudeville festival. Their Krankenhaus? EP was released digitally in October 2007 and on CD and vinyl on 20 November.

In 2008, violist Abi Fry toured with the band (later becoming a permanent member). On 14 January 2008, third-album Do You Like Rock Music? was released in the UK (12 February 2008 in the USA) and was a UK Top 10 success. Later that January, keyboard/cornet player Phil Sumner was admitted to hospital in Leeds (after being knocked unconscious attempting to stage dive from a 12-foot PA system), in spite of which he returned to the stage the following day. Prior to their Do You Like Rock Music? tour (of Ireland, UK, Belgium, the Netherlands, Germany and USA), Wood injured his back and was temporarily replaced by Thomas White of Electric Soft Parade and Brakes.

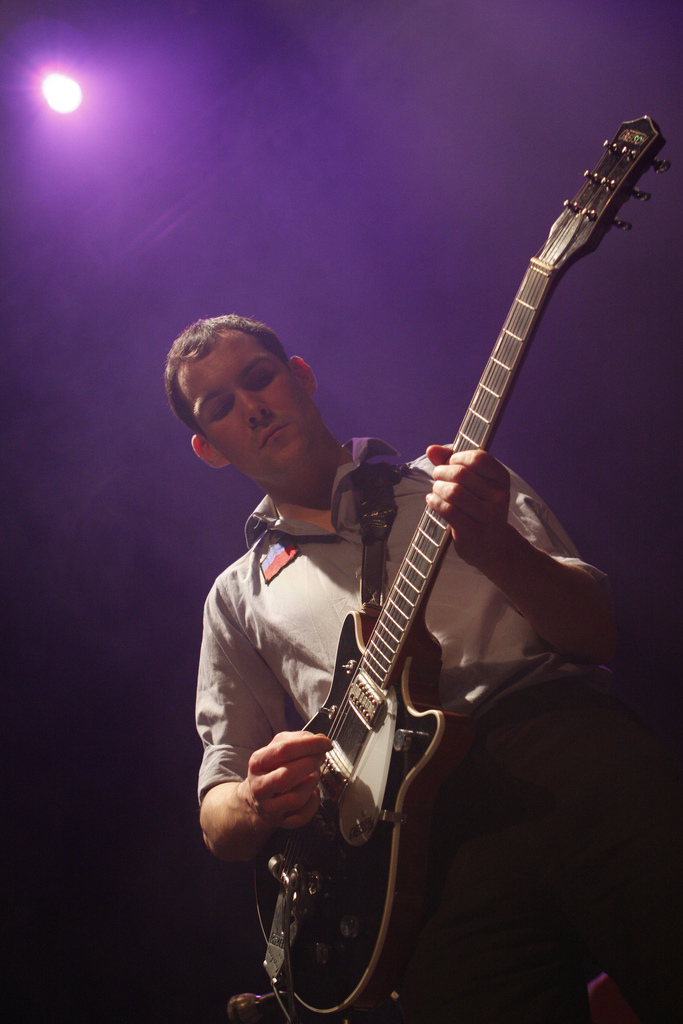
Guitarist Martin Noble playing in Paris in 2008

In February 2008, the band appeared on Later with Jools Holland, playing "Waving Flags", "Canvey Island" and "No Lucifer". They were accompanied by members of the London Bulgarian Choir and a display of Cumbrian wrestling.

The band also played an intimate concert at The Monico Hotel in Canvey Island as a nod to the 5th track on their new album. Prior to the gig, the band took part in a training session at Canvey Island Football Club. They were joined on stage for their encore by Wilko Johnson, formerly of Canvey pub rock band Dr. Feelgood. The performance was featured on BBC2's The Culture Show.

The band played "No Lucifer" on the Late Show with David Letterman on 12 March 2008 and had a concert filmed for the Canadian music series Beautiful Noise. During Summer 2008, the band played at Glastonbury, Reading and Leeds, T in the Park and Bestival, amongst other festivals.

On 22 July 2008, Do You Like Rock Music? was announced as one of the nominees for the 2008 Mercury Prize. To coincide with the nomination British Sea Power re-released their song "Waving Flags" on 8 September 2008, which they also performed at the award ceremony the following day.

In August 2008, the band hosted their own music festival, Sing Ye From The Hillsides!, at the Tan Hill Inn, the UK's highest pub. A second festival was held at the same location in May 2010.

On 23 January 2009, the band announced that they were recording a soundtrack to the documentary Man of Aran. They performed it in concert at the British Film Institute in April, and a CD/DVD was released in May. On 7 February 2009, they released a new 10-minute track, "The possibility of an island", on Myspace.

Their live performances in the summer of 2009 included a show at Regent's Park Open Air Theatre in London.

=== Valhalla Dancehall (2010–2011) ===
The band headlined the Festival Republic Stage at the 2010 Reading and Leeds Festivals, on 29 and 28 August respectively. They supported the Manic Street Preachers on their autumn 2010 tour of Britain.

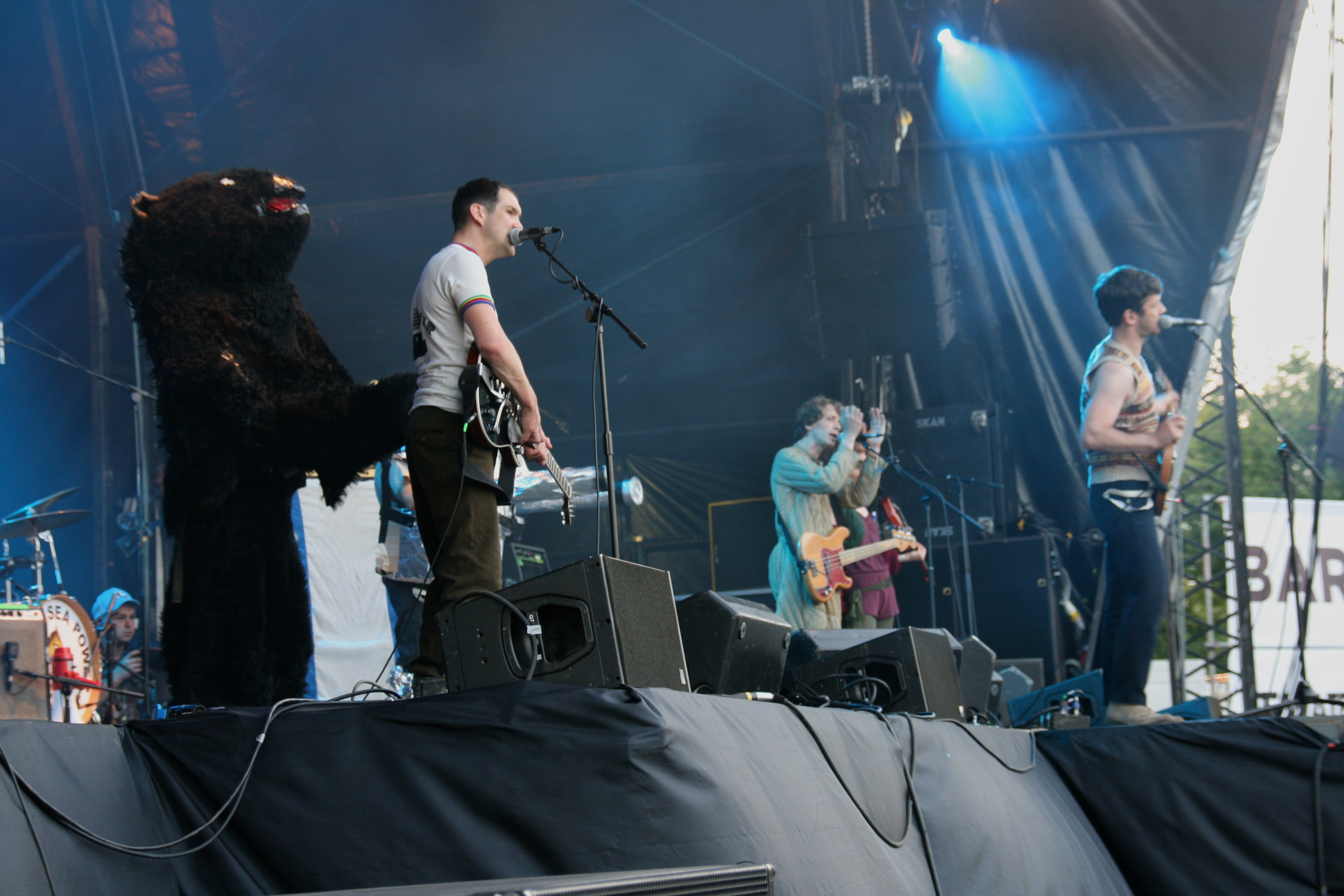
British Sea Power performing at Jodrell Bank Live

The band released a 'Maxi EP' Zeus, in October 2010, featuring songs recorded during the sessions for the forthcoming album.

The album Valhalla Dancehall, recorded on the isle of Skye in Scotland and at a farmhouse in East Sussex, was released in January 2011. Initial copies of the album sold by some independent music stores in the UK were accompanied with a bonus EP, Valhalla V.I.P.. The band toured the UK in the first three months of 2011, and a tour of the United States was planned for March, including an appearance on Late Show with David Letterman on 21 March.

To mark the ten-year anniversary of their first single, "Fear of Drowning", the band played three intimate shows at Berwick Village Hall in East Sussex in May 2011.

British Sea Power announced a number of forthcoming festival appearances for summer 2011, including Latitude Festival, Leefest, Get Loaded In The Park and the Port Eliot Festival. In addition, the band performed at Jodrell Bank Live at Jodrell Bank Observatory, with The Flaming Lips, in July 2011. They also performed at festivals in Australia, China and Japan.

September 2011 saw the publication on Rough Trade Books of Do It for Your Mum by Roy Wilkinson (brother of Yan and Hamilton), an account of the author's experiences of managing the band and of how the family's octogenarian father became the group's most ardent fan, apart from Richard Mills.

=== Machineries of Joy and film scores (2012–2013) ===
In 2012 they announced that they would not be extensively touring, but would be playing at their own monthly club night, "Krankenhaus", in Brighton. The band were also commissioned to make a soundtrack for the 1999 documentary Out of the Present, which follows Sergei Krikalev's time on the space station Mir. It was screened at CERN in March 2012 as part of the Cineglobe International Film Festival. The band took a novel approach to the creation of their 2013 album Machineries of Joy. During the first half of 2012, the band wrote and recorded new songs each month, which they released as limited edition EPs, coinciding with their "Krankenhaus" club nights. A selection of tracks from the six EPs were re-recorded later in the year, and the final album was released on 1 April 2013.

British Sea Power recorded the soundtrack for the film From the Sea to the Land Beyond: Britain's Coast on Film, with the main track being a version of "The Land Beyond" played at both the beginning and end of the film. The film is made up of archive footage taken during the 20th century and featuring aspects of British coastal life, montaged together. The film premiered at the Sheffield Doc/Fest in June 2012, with the band performing live at the screening. They also performed live at an initial screening of the film at Brighton's Cine-City film festival. The film was shown on BBC Four television in 2012 (and has since been repeated in 2013 and 2016), as part of their Storyville series strand. A first DVD of the film was released in January 2013, but it was later re-released together with the soundtrack album in December 2013.

The group made the soundtrack for the 2014 documentary film Happiness. They released the soundtrack as an album later in the year.

=== Sea of Brass and debut album anniversary (2014–2015) ===
In late 2014 British Sea Power performed a series of concerts around the UK accompanied by different brass bands, going under the moniker "Sea of Brass". Following the concerts, an album was released in 2015, also entitled Sea of Brass. (The band had previous experience playing with a brass band, having performed "Waving Flags" with Brighton and Hove City Brass at several of their Krankenhaus club nights in 2012.)

In mid-2015, the 12th anniversary of The Decline of British Sea Power was celebrated with concerts in Brighton, Manchester and London at which the full album was played. Eamon Hamilton returned for these shows. At around the same time, the album was reissued in various formats, along with bonus discs, on the band's Golden Chariot label.

=== Let the Dancers Inherit the Party and Disco Elysium (2016–2021) ===
In late 2016 the band instituted a crowd-funded project to finance the recording of their next studio album, Let The Dancers Inherit The Party, which was released on 31 March 2017. The band also played at Glastonbury Festival 2017.

In 2019, the band composed the score for the role-playing video game Disco Elysium. At the 16th BAFTA Game Awards, in early April 2020, they received the award for Best Music for their work on Disco Elysium.

The band organised the first edition of their own festival, Krankenhaus Festival, held at Muncaster Castle, Cumbria in August 2019.

=== Name change and Everything Was Forever (2021–present) ===
On Monday 9 August 2021, the band announced that they would henceforth be known as Sea Power due to "a rise in a certain kind of nationalism in this world – an isolationist, antagonistic nationalism that [they] don't want to run any risk of being confused with", and that their new album, Everything Was Forever, would be released in February 2022. The album peaked at number 4 in the UK Album Chart.

2022 saw the return of Krankenhaus Festival, and it has been organised annually since then. It won "BBC 6 Music listeners' Best Festival of the Year" following the 2023 edition.

In June 2023 it was announced that Matthew Wood had retired from the band, and that Thomas White would play drums at upcoming live shows.

== Band line-up ==
Current members

- Jan Scott Wilkinson – vocals, guitar (1995–present)
- Neil Hamilton Wilkinson – bass guitar, vocals, guitar (c.2000–present)
- Martin Noble – guitar (1995–present)
- Phil Sumner – cornet, keyboards (2006–present)
- Abi Fry – viola (2008–present)

Former members

- Eamon Hamilton – keyboards, vocals, percussion, guitar (2002–2006)
- Alison Cotton (1995–c.1999)
- Matthew Wood – drums (c. 2000–2023)

== Discography ==
- The Decline of British Sea Power (2003)
- Open Season (2005)
- Do You Like Rock Music? (2008)
- Man of Aran (2009)
- Valhalla Dancehall (2011)
- Machineries of Joy (2013)
- From the Sea to the Land Beyond (2013)
- Sea of Brass (2015)
- Let the Dancers Inherit the Party (2017)
- Disco Elysium (2019)
- Everything Was Forever (2022)
