= Saint Louis =

Saint Louis, Saint-Louis or St. Louis commonly refers to:

- Louis IX of France, King of France from 1226 to 1270
- St. Louis, a city in Missouri, US, named after the former

Saint Louis, Saint-Louis or St. Louis may also refer to:

== Arts and media ==
=== Periodicals ===
- St. Louis Globe-Democrat (1852-1986), former daily newspaper in St. Louis, Missouri
- St. Louis Daily Record
- St. Louis Jewish Light, Missouri weekly newspaper aimed at the Jewish community
- St. Louis Post-Dispatch, daily newspaper in St. Louis, Missouri
- The St. Louis American, Missouri weekly newspaper aimed at African-Americans
- St. Louis Magazine

=== Other uses in arts and media ===
- Saint Louis (El Greco), a c. 1592–1595 painting

== Buildings and facilities ==
=== Hospitals ===
- Hôpital Saint-Louis, Paris
- Mercy Hospital St. Louis
- St. Louis Children's Hospital
- Saint Louis University Hospital
- Washington University in St. Louis School of Medicine

=== Houses of worship ===
- St. Louis Cathedral (disambiguation)
- Saint-Paul-Saint-Louis, a church in Paris
- St. Louis Catholic Church (North Star, Ohio)

=== Museums ===
- Contemporary Art Museum St. Louis
- Saint Louis Art Museum
- St. Louis Cardinals Hall of Fame and Museum
- St. Louis Soccer Hall of Fame
- Saint Louis University Museum of Art
- The Magic House, St. Louis Children's Museum

=== Other buildings and facilities ===
- St. Louis Hotel, in 19th-century New Orleans, Louisiana
- St. Louis Plantation, in Iberville Parish, Louisiana

== Events ==
- St. Louis Chinese Culture Day
- St. Louis Worlds Fair

== People ==
=== Saints ===
- Louis (died 855), or Ludovicus, one of the 48 Martyrs of Córdoba

==== Roman Catholic ====
- Louis IX of France (1214–1270), King of France
- Louis of Toulouse (1274–1297), French-Neapolitan bishop and noble
- Louis de Montfort (1673–1716), French priest

=== Surname ===
- Ali St. Louis (1959–2011), Trinidadian sprinter
- Brad St. Louis (born 1976), American football player
- Dexter St. Louis (1968–2019), Trinidadian table tennis player
- Dylan Saint-Louis (born 1995), Congolese footballer
- Fabienne St Louis (born 1988), Mauritian triathlete
- France Saint-Louis (born 1958), Canadian ice hockey player and coach
- François St-Louis, Canadian politician
- Jean-Pierre St-Louis (1951–2020), Canadian cinematographer
- Jeremy St. Louis (born 1971), Canadian journalist
- Jimson St. Louis (born 2002), U.S. Virgin Islands soccer player
- Krysan St. Louis (born 2003), Saint Lucian footballer
- Louis St. Louis (1942–2021), American songwriter
- Lucy St. Louis (born 1992), English actress and singer
- Marie Michele St. Louis (1968–2024), Mauritian judoka
- Martin St. Louis (born 1975), Canadian ice hockey player and coach
- Michel-Henri St-Louis, Canadian military officer
- Natasha St. Louis (born 1991), Trinidadian footballer
- Nathaniel St. Louis (born 2000), Canadian soccer player
- Tasha St. Louis (born 1983), Trinidadian footballer
- Terry St. Louis (born 1969), Trinidadian footballer
- Tyree St. Louis (born 1997), American football player

=== Other people ===
- Ralph St. Louis Pieris Deraniyagala, Sri Lankan politician
- St. Louis Estes, American physician and raw food diet proponent
- St. Louis Jimmy Oden (1903–1974), American musician

== Places ==
=== Canada ===
- Saint-Louis, Quebec, a municipality
- Saint-Louis-de-Blandford, Quebec, a small town northeast of Montreal
- Saint-Louis-de-France, Quebec, a former town merged into Trois-Rivières in 2002
- Saint-Louis-de-Gonzague, Chaudière-Appalaches, Quebec, a municipality in the Les Etchemins Regional County Municipality
- Saint-Louis-de-Gonzague, Montérégie, Quebec, a parish municipality in the Beauharnois-Salaberry Regional County Municipality
- Saint-Louis-de-Gonzague-du-Cap-Tourmente, a parish municipality in Quebec
- Saint-Louis-du-Ha! Ha!, a parish municipality in the Témiscouata Regional County Municipality in Quebec
- Lake Saint-Louis, a lake in southwestern Quebec
- Saint-Louis (provincial electoral district), a former electoral district in Montreal, Quebec
- Saint-Louis-de-Kent, New Brunswick, a village
- Saint-Louis Parish, New Brunswick
- St. Louis, Prince Edward Island, an unincorporated community
- Rural Municipality of St. Louis No. 431, Saskatchewan
  - St. Louis, Saskatchewan, a village

=== France ===
- Saint-Louis, Haut-Rhin, a commune in the Haut-Rhin département at the German and Swiss border
- Saint-Louis, Moselle, a commune in the Moselle département
- Saint-Louis, Guadeloupe, a commune in the overseas department of Guadeloupe
- Saint-Louis, New Caledonia, a settlement in the overseas collectivity of New Caledonia
- Saint-Louis, Réunion, commune in the overseas department of Réunion
- Île Saint-Louis, an island on the Seine in Paris
- Saint-Louis-de-Montferrand, Gironde
- Saint-Louis-en-l'Isle, Dordogne
- Saint-Louis-et-Parahou, Aude
- Saint-Louis-lès-Bitche, Moselle

=== Haiti ===
- Saint-Louis-du-Sud, a commune in the Sud department of Haiti
- Saint-Louis-du-Nord, a commune in the Nord department of Haiti

=== Seychelles ===
- Saint Louis, Seychelles, an administrative district on the island of Mahé

=== Senegal ===
- Saint-Louis, Senegal, capital city of the Saint-Louis Region
- Saint-Louis Region, a region on the border with Mauritania

=== Thailand ===
- Saint Louis BTS station, a rapid transit station in Bangrak and Sathon, Bangkok
- Saint Louis Hospital, a private Catholic hospital in Sathon, Bangkok

=== United States ===
- Bay St. Louis, Mississippi, city in Hancock County
- East St. Louis, Illinois, city in St. Clair County east of St. Louis, Missouri
- Old Saint Louis, Indiana, unincorporated community
- San Luis Obispo, California (Spanish for "St. Louis, Bishop"), a city in California
- San Luis Obispo County, California, a county in California
- St. Louis, Missouri, independent city
  - Downtown St. Louis, central business district of St. Louis, Missouri
  - Greater St. Louis, bi-state metropolitan area
- St. Louis County, Missouri, bordering the city of St. Louis
- Lake St. Louis, Missouri, planned community in St. Charles County
- St. Louis, Michigan, city in Gratiot County
- St. Louis County, Minnesota
- St. Louis Park, Minnesota, city in Hennepin County
- Saint Louis River (Lake Superior tributary), river in Minnesota and Wisconsin
- Saint Louis Creek, a stream in Colorado
- St. Louis, Oklahoma, town in Pottawatomie County
  - Zincville, Oklahoma, town in Ottawa County, formally called name St. Louis
- Saint Louis, Oregon, unincorporated community
- Saint Louis, Virginia, unincorporated community

== Religious institutions ==
- Archdiocese of St. Louis
- St. Louis Cathedral (disambiguation)
- Saint-Paul-Saint-Louis, a church in Paris
- St. Louis Catholic Church (North Star, Ohio)

== Schools ==
=== Colleges and universities ===
- Lycée Saint-Louis, in Paris, France
- Saint Louis University, St. Louis, Missouri
- Saint-Louis University, Brussels, Brussels, Belgium
- Saint Louis University (Philippines), a private teaching university in Baguio
- St. Louis Christian College, Florissant, Missouri
- St. Louis Community College
- St. Louis College Valenzuela, Valenzuela City, Philippines
- University of Health Sciences and Pharmacy in St. Louis, St. Louis, Missouri
- University of Missouri–St. Louis, St. Louis, Missouri
- University of Saint Louis Tuguegarao, Tuguegarao City, Philippines
- Washington University in St. Louis, St. Louis, Missouri

=== Other schools ===
- St. Louis School, Hong Kong

== Sports ==
=== Teams in minor and semi-pro leagues ===
- St. Louis Ambush (2013), indoor soccer team
  - St. Louis Ambush (1992–2000)
- St. Louis Battlehawks, professional football team in the United Football League
- St. Louis Flyers, former ice hockey team in the American Hockey League
- St. Louis Jr. Blues, ice hockey team in the North American 3 Hockey League
- St. Louis Lions, Missouri soccer team in the USL League Two
- St. Louis Slam, Missouri women's football team in the Women's Football Alliance
- St. Louis Surge, Missouri women's basketball team in the Global Women's Basketball Association
- St. Louis Trotters, Missouri basketball team in the Independent Basketball Association

=== Former teams ===
- St. Louis Aces, former team tennis team
- St. Louis Bandits, Missouri ice hockey team in the North American Hockey League
- St. Louis Bombers (1946-1950), defunct National Basketball Association team
- St. Louis All-Stars, a professional football team during the 1923 NFL season
- St. Louis Attack (2014-2015), a professional indoor football team now known as the River City Monsters
- St. Louis Browns, a professional baseball team that became the Baltimore Orioles in 1954
- St. Louis Gunners, a 1934 member of the National Football League that joined the minor AFL in 1939
- St. Louis Hawks, professional basketball team from 1955 to 1968, now known as the Atlanta Hawks
- St. Louis Heartland Eagles, former junior ice hockey team in the United States Hockey League
- St. Louis Stampede, members of the Arena Football League 1995–1996
- St. Louis Steamers (1979–1988), former indoor soccer team
- St. Louis Storm, former indoor soccer team
- St. Louis Vipers, former professional roller hockey team

=== Soccer teams ===
- Saint Louis FC, American men's team
- AC St. Louis, American men's team
- FC St. Louis, American women's team
- Saint Louis Athletica, American women's team
- SS Saint-Louisienne, Réunion team
- Saint Louis Suns United FC, Seychelles team
- St. Louis City SC, American men's team
  - St. Louis City 2, reserve team

=== Venues ===
- St. Louis Arena
- St. Louis Coliseum

=== Other uses in sports ===
- St Louis (horse), a racehorse
- Arizona Cardinals, a professional NFL team known as the St. Louis Cardinals from 1960 to 1987
  - See History of the St. Louis Cardinals (NFL) for more details on the team's tenure in St. Louis
- Los Angeles Rams, a professional NFL team known as the St. Louis Rams from 1995 to 2015
  - See History of the St. Louis Rams for more details on the team's tenure in St. Louis
- Saint Louis Billikens, the intercollegiate athletic program of Saint Louis University
- St. Louis Blues, a professional ice hockey team in the National Hockey League
- St. Louis Cardinals, a professional baseball team in Major League Baseball

== Transportation ==
=== Ships ===
- Saint Louis (1752 ship), a French East Indiaman
- French battleship Saint Louis, a French Navy battleship in commission from 1900 to 1919
- Saint Louis (hotel barge), a hotel barge in southwest France
- Saint-Louis-class cruiser, a class of planned French heavy cruiser, never built
- MS St. Louis, a German ocean liner, notable for a voyage in 1939 when it carried 908 Jewish refugees from Germany
- USS St. Louis, seven US Navy ships

=== Airports ===
- St. Louis Airport (disambiguation)

=== Railways ===
- Red Line (St. Louis MetroLink), light rail line in St. Louis, Missouri
- St. Louis–San Francisco Railway

=== Depots ===
- St. Louis Union Station, historic former railroad station in St. Louis, Missouri

== Other uses ==
- Fort St. Louis (disambiguation)
- Sisters of St. Louis, a religious union of nuns
- St. Louis (beer), a Belgian-style beer by Brouwerij Van Honsebrouck
- St. Louis Car Company, a manufacturer of streetcars, trolleybuses and locomotives
- Saint-Louis (glass manufacturer), a French glass manufacturer
- Order of Saint Louis, a military Order of Chivalry

== See also ==
- San Luis (disambiguation), the Spanish language cognate of the name
- San Luis Obispo, California, a city in the U.S. state of California
- São Luís (disambiguation), the Portuguese language cognate of the name
- The Spirit of St. Louis (disambiguation)
