= Louisa (ship) =

Many ships have borne the name Louisa, including:

- Four ships of the Royal Navy have been named HMS Louisa, as have several hired armed vessels that served the Royal Navy under contract:

- HM Hired armed brig Louisa
- HM Hired tender Louisa

- Louisa (1798 ship) was launched in France in 1794, probably under another name. She was taken in prize and between 1798 and 1804 she made five complete voyages as a slave ship in the triangular trade in enslaved people. She was lost on the coast of Africa on her sixth voyage.
- Louisa (Quasi-War privateer), an American privateer, participated in the Quasi-War with France in 1800.
- Louisa, a Swedish ship captured by the Spanish in 1800 while sailing from Lisbon to Barcelona. See List of ships captured in the 18th century#1800.
- Louisa (1823), of 242 tons (bm (old measurement)) or 306 tons (bm (new measurement)), was launched by J. Fowler at Howrah or Sulkea, Calcutta in 1823. She had a length of 86 ft 0 in (26.2 m), a beam of 23 ft 0 in (7.0 m), and a hold depth of 16 ft 4 in (5.0 m). In 1849 and 1853, she visited Adelaide.
- Louisa (1824) was built by Thomas de la Mare at South Beach, St Peter Port, Guernsey. She had a burthen of 16971/94 tons, but was later remeasured at 1413035/3500 nrt brig. In 1853 she was sold and her registry transferred to London. The vessel sailed to Australia in the 1850s where she became a whaler based in Hobart. She sailed from Hobart, Tasmania for Melbourne, Victoria on 16 December 1882 and was last seen the following day off Bicheno, in bad weather.

== See also ==
- SS Königin Luise, various ships
- SS Louise Lykes, various ships
- USS Louise, various ships
