= List of ships named SS St. Louis =

Ships named SS St. Louis include:

- MS St. Louis, a diesel-powered passenger ship sometimes referred to as "SS St. Louis"; built in 1925 by Bremer Vulkan for the Hamburg America Line. It carried Jewish refugees from Nazi Germany in 1939 in an unsuccessful emigration attempt; scrapped in Hamburg in 1952. After nearly all of its original passengers were turned away, the unsuccessful 907 were brought back to Belgium, 154 of later to be killed in the Holocaust.
- SS St. Louis (1894), a passenger steamer built by William Cramp & Sons of Philadelphia for the American Line; became USS St. Louis during Spanish–American War, and USS Louisville (SP-1644) during World War I; burned and sank at Hoboken, New Jersey in 1920; scrapped in Italy in 1925.
- SS St. Louis (1944), an 18,362-gross register ton container ship of Sea-Land Service active until 1988; an enlarged and rebuilt ship created from the former USS General M. L. Hersey (AP-148), a World War II transport ship of the United States Navy.

== See also ==
- USS St. Louis, the name of several United States Navy ships
