= Louisville (disambiguation) =

Louisville is the largest city in the U.S. Commonwealth of Kentucky.

Louisville may also refer to:

== Places ==
- Louisville, Belize
- Louisville, Alabama
- Greenwood, El Dorado County, California, formerly Louisville, California
- Louisville, Colorado
- Louisville, Georgia, a former capital of Georgia
- Louisville, Illinois
- Louisville, Kansas
- Louisville, Mississippi
- Louisville, Chariton County, Missouri
- Louisville, Lincoln County, Missouri
- Louisville, Nebraska
- Louisville, New York
- Louisville, Ohio, a city in Stark County, Ohio
- Louisville, Adams County, Ohio
- Louisville, Tennessee

== Ships ==
- USS Louisville (1861), an ironclad steamboat used during the American Civil War
- USS Louisville (ID-1644)), a steamship used in 1918 as a troop transport
- USS Louisville (CA-28), a heavy cruiser commissioned in 1931 and active in World War II
- USS Louisville (SSN-724), a Los Angeles-class nuclear attack submarine commissioned 1986–2021

== Other uses ==
- University of Louisville, a public university in Louisville, Kentucky
  - Louisville Cardinals, their intercollegiate athletic program
- Louisville (magazine), a magazine about Louisville, Kentucky

== See also ==
- Louisville Township (disambiguation)
- Lewisville (disambiguation)
- Louis (disambiguation)
- Louiseville
- St. Louisville, Ohio, a village in Licking County
- USS Louisville, a list of ships
