= San Luis =

San Luis (Spanish for "Saint Louis") may refer to:

== Places ==
=== Argentina ===
- San Luis Province
- San Luis, Argentina, capital of San Luis Province

=== Belize ===
- San Luis, Belize, in Orange Walk District

=== Colombia ===
- San Luis, Antioquia, a town and municipality in the Antioquia Department
- San Luis de Palenque, a town and municipality in the Casanare Department
- San Luis, Tolima, a town and municipality in the Tolima Department

=== Costa Rica ===
- San Luis District, Turrubares, San José province

=== Cuba ===
- San Luis, Pinar del Río
- San Luis, Santiago de Cuba

=== Dominican Republic ===
- Fortaleza San Luis, a Spanish colonial fort in Santiago
- San Luis, Santo Domingo, a town and municipality in the Santo Domingo Province

=== Guatemala ===
- San Luis, El Petén

=== Honduras ===
- San Luis, Santa Bárbara

=== Mexico ===
- San Luis, Baja California
- San Luis Acatlán, Guerrero
- San Luis de la Paz, Guanajuato
- San Luis Potosí, a state
- San Luis Potosí, San Luis Potosí, that state's capital city
- San Luis Río Colorado, Sonora
- San Luis Soyatlán, Jalisco
- Sierra San Luis, a mountain range in Chihuahua-Sonora

=== Peru ===
- San Luis, Ancash, capital of Carlos Fermín Fitzcarrald Province in Ancash Region
- San Luis District, Cañete, Lima Region
- San Luis District, Carlos Fermín Fitzcarrald
- San Luis District, Lima
- San Luis District, San Pablo

=== Philippines ===
- San Luis, Agusan del Sur
- San Luis, Aurora
- San Luis, Batangas
- San Luis, Pampanga

=== Spain ===
- San Luis, the Spanish name for Sant Lluís, a municipality on Menorca, Spain

=== United States ===
- San Luis, Arizona
- San Luis, Colorado
- San Luis Mountains in Arizona
- San Luis Obispo, California
- San Luis Reservoir in California
- San Luis Valley in Colorado
- Mission San Luis Rey de Francia in California
- Mission San Luis de Apalachee in Florida

=== Uruguay ===
- San Luis, Uruguay, in Canelones Department
- San Luis al Medio, Rocha
- San Luis River, Rocha

=== Venezuela ===
- San Luis, Falcón, in the state of Falcón

== Other uses ==
- San Luis Airport (disambiguation)
- San Luis F.C., a Mexican football (soccer) team
- San Luis de Quillota, a Chilean football team
- ARA San Luis, various ships of the Argentine Navy

== See also ==
- Saint Louis (disambiguation)
- São Luís (disambiguation)
