= HMS Louis =

Two ships of the Royal Navy have been named HMS Louis, after Rear-Admiral Sir Thomas Louis:

- HMS Louis (1913) was a Laforey-class destroyer, built as HMS Talisman, but renamed before being launched in 1913. She was wrecked in 1915.
- HMS Louis (K515) was a Captain-class frigate launched in 1943 and transferred to the Royal Navy under lend-lease. She was returned to the US Navy in 1946.

== See also ==
- Louis (disambiguation)
- HMS Louisa
- HMCS Porte St. Louis (YMG 183)
- USS St. Louis
