= Louisville Township, Minnesota =

Louisville Township, Minnesota may refer to:

- Louisville Township, Red Lake County, Minnesota
- Louisville Township, Scott County, Minnesota

== See also ==
- Louisville Township (disambiguation)
