= St. Lewis =

St. Lewis may refer to:

- St. Lewis, Newfoundland and Labrador, Canada
  - St. Lewis (Fox Harbour) Airport
- A ward in the former federal electoral district of Montreal East, Quebec, Canada
- Keni St. Lewis, American songwriter; see, for example, "Heaven Must Be Missing an Angel"

== See also ==
- Saint Louis (disambiguation)
- St. Louis, Missouri, United States
