= HMS Louisa =

Four ships of the Royal Navy have been named HMS Louisa:

- HMS Louisa (1794) was a 3-gun gunvessel, previously a hoy, purchased in 1794 and sold in 1798.
- HMS Louisa was also a 3-gun vessel, separate from the above, purchased in 1798 and sold in 1799.
- HMS Louisa (1814) was a tender in service in 1814 and sold in 1816.
- HMS Louisa (1834) was a cutter purchased in 1834. She foundered in 1841.
- HMS Louisa (1855) was an Albacore-class wooden screw gunboat launched in 1855 and sold in 1867.

== See also ==
- HM Hired armed brig Louisa
- HM Hired tender Louisa
- HMS Louis
- HMS Princess Louisa
- USS Louise
