= Poughkeepsie (YTB-813) =

Natick-class harbor tug

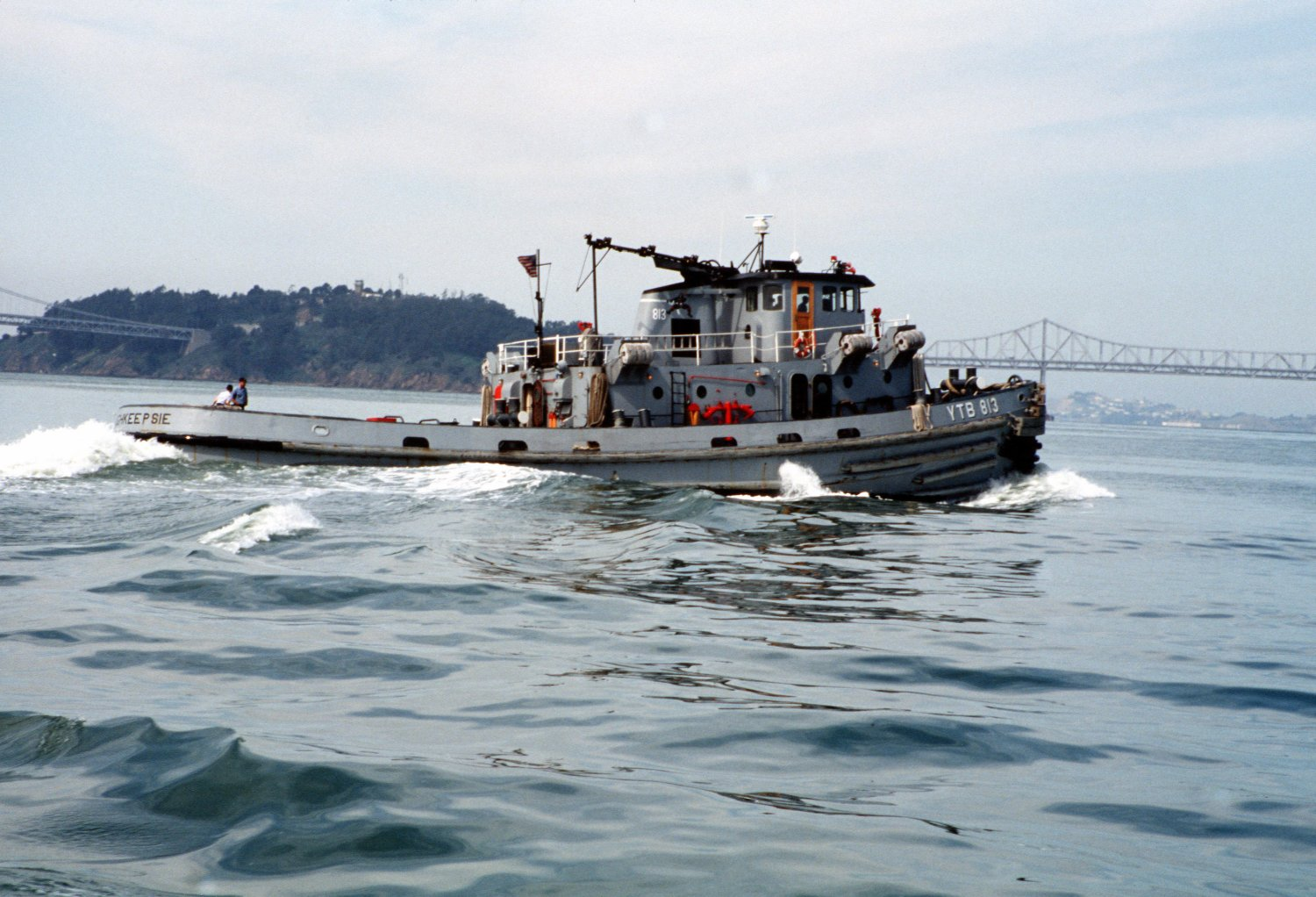
- Poughkeepsie (YTB-813) heads for Naval Station Treasure Island, California. after escorting USS Louisville (SSN-724) into port at Naval Air Station Alameda, California., 11 March 1992.

History

United States
- Awarded: 22 June 1970
- Builder: Peterson Builders, Sturgeon Bay, WI
- Laid down: 16 February 1971
- Launched: 23 July 1971
- In service: 27 November 1971
- Stricken: 26 April 2006
- Fate: Sold into commercial service, 27 February 2008

General characteristics
- Class & type: Natick-class large harbor tug
- Displacement: 282 long tons (287 t) (light); 344 long tons (350 t) (full)
- Length: 109 ft (33 m)
- Beam: 31 ft (9.4 m)
- Draft: 14 ft (4.3 m)
- Speed: 12 knots (14 mph; 22 km/h)
- Complement: 12
- Armament: None

Poughkeepsie (YTB-813) was a United States Navy Natick-class large harbor tug named for Poughkeepsie, New York.

== Construction ==
The contract for Poughkeepsie was awarded 22 June 1970. She was laid down on 16 February 1971 at Sturgeon Bay, Wisconsin, by Peterson Builders and launched 23 July 1971.

== Operational history ==
Delivered to the Navy 27 November 1971, Poughkeepsie was assigned to duties in the San Francisco Bay area. In the mid-1990s, she was transferred to Naval Station Pearl Harbor, Hawaii.

Stricken from the Navy List 26 April 2006, ex-Poughkeepsie was sold by Defense Reutilization and Marketing Service (DRMS) 27 February 2008.
