= USS St. Louis =

USS St. Louis may refer to:

- USS St. Louis (1828), a sloop-of-war commissioned in 1828. decommissioned in 1865, and stricken in 1907
- USS St. Louis (1861), an ironclad gunboat commissioned in 1862, later renamed Baron de Kalb, and sunk in 1863 during the American Civil War
- USS St. Louis, a troop transport in commission in 1898, which otherwise served as the civilian passenger liner SS St. Louis (1894) from 1895 to 1918 and from 1919 to 1920 and was in commission again as the troop transport USS Louisville from 1918 to 1919
- USS St. Louis (C-20), a protected cruiser in commission from 1906 to 1922
- USS St. Louis (CL-49), a light cruiser in commission from 1939 to 1946
- USS St. Louis (LKA-116), an amphibious cargo ship in commission from 1969 to 1992
- USS St. Louis (LCS-19), a Freedom-class littoral combat ship in commission since 2020

== See also ==
- St. Louis (disambiguation)
- MS St. Louis, a German passenger liner which entered service in 1929 and was scrapped in 1952 which was involved in transporting refugees from Nazi Germany in 1939
- USS General M. L. Hersey (AP-148), a United States Navy (later United States Army) troop transport which later became the civilian cargo ship SS St. Louis
- USS Louisville, the name of more than one United States Navy ship
- USS Louise
- HMS Louis
- HMCS Porte St. Louis (YMG 183)
