= USS Louisville =

Four vessels of the United States Navy have been named USS Louisville, after the city of Louisville, Kentucky:

- USS Louisville (1861), was an ironclad steamboat used during the American Civil War
- USS Louisville (ID-1644), was the steamship St. Louis renamed and used in 1918 as a troop transport
- USS Louisville (CA-28), was a heavy cruiser commissioned in 1931 and active in World War II
- USS Louisville (SSN-724), is a Los Angeles-class nuclear attack submarine commissioned in 1986 and decommissioned in March 2021

== See also ==
- Louisville (disambiguation)
- USS St. Louis
- USS Louise
