= USS Louise =

USS Louise may refer to:

- USS Louise No. 2 (SP-1230)
- USS Mary Louise (SP-356)

== See also ==
- Louisa (ship), various ships
- Louise (steamship), a paddle steamer that operated in Chesapeake Bay
- SS Königin Luise, various ships
- SS Louise Lykes, various ships
- USS Louisville, various ships
- USS St. Louis, various ships
