= Fort St. Louis (Shelburne County, Nova Scotia) =

Historic site in Nova Scotia, Canada

Coordinates: 43°29′42″N 65°28′13″W

Fort Saint Louis was a fort built by Charles de Latour for the French Empire in 1623 in its colony of Acadia. During the Scottish occupation of Port Royal from 1629 to 1632, this fort was France's only foothold in Acadia. The British were unsuccessful in their attempts to capture the fort, and France regained Acadia in 1632. The archaeological remains of the former fort are located in what is today Port La Tour, Shelburne, County Nova Scotia.

The site of Fort St Louis was designated a National Historic Site in 1931. The Historic Sites and Monuments Board of Canada placed a cairn and plaque (dated 1937) commemorating the fort at a site in Port La Tour, Nova Scotia.

== See also ==
- Fort St. Louis
- List of French forts in North America
- New France
