= Whirl Pool Dips =

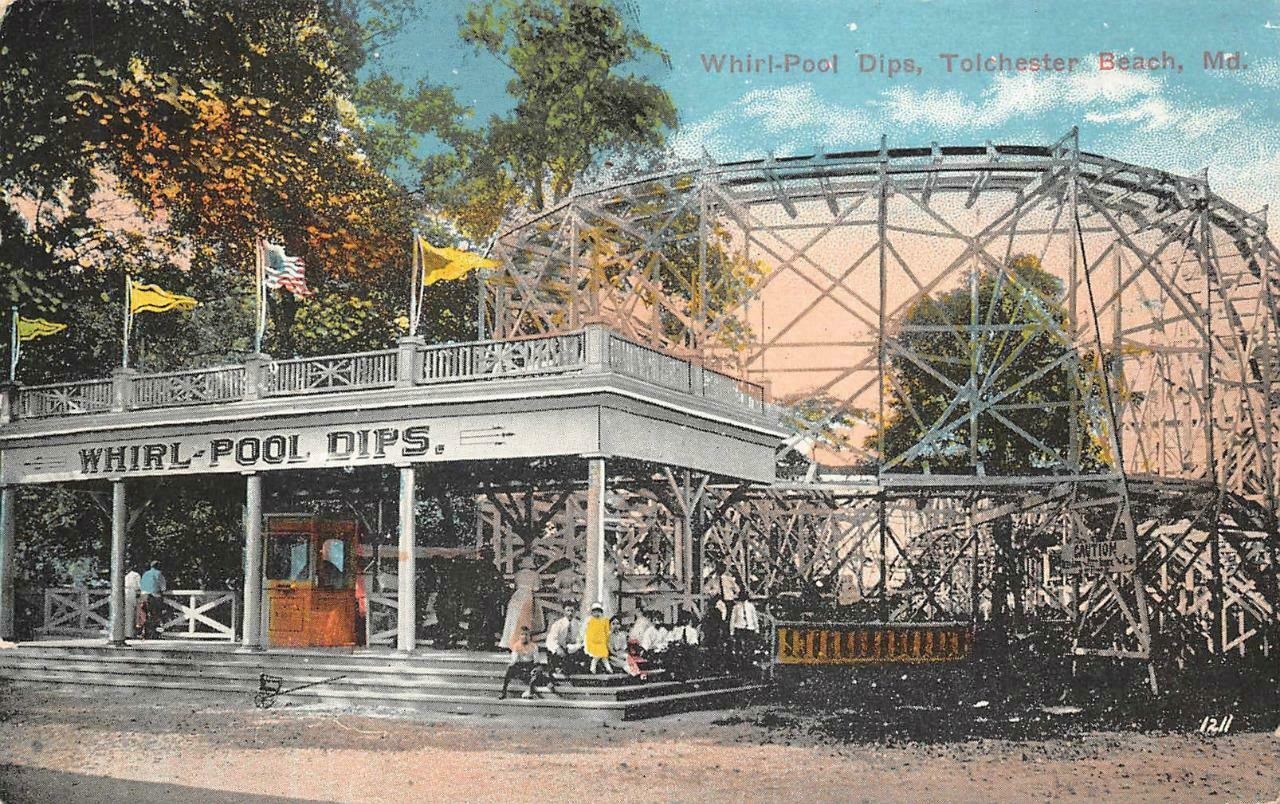

Tolchester Beach Park
- Location: Tolchester Beach Park
- Coordinates: 39.214°N 76.231°W
- Status: Removed
- Opening date: 1913
- Closing date: 1959
- Cost: $50,000

General statistics
- Type: Wood
- Whirl Pool Dips at RCDB

The Whirl Pool Dips was a side friction roller coaster located at Tolchester Beach Park in Tolchester Beach, Maryland. It operated from 1913 until 1959.
