= SS Louise Lykes =

SS Louise Lykes may refer to one of the following ships built for the United States Maritime Commission (USMC):

- SS Louise Lykes (1941), a Type C2-F ship launched in 1941 and sunk by the German submarine U-384 on 9 January 1943; all hands (84 men) lost
- SS Louise Lykes (1945), a Type C2-S-AJ1 ship built at Wilmington, North Carolina was sold in 1945 and scrapped in 1972
- SS Louise Lykes (1965), a Type C4-S-66a ship built at Avondale Shipyards in January 1964; later renamed Louise and scrapped in 1995. Captain P. Kelly and Chief Engineer Joe D Watson Jr. were the chief officers when the Louise was scrapped. The Louise was the first American merchant ship to enter North Korea since the seizure of the SS Mayaguez. The Louise entered North Korea as part of the Feed the World program.

== See also ==
- USS Louise
- HMS Louisa
