= HMCS Porte de la Reine =

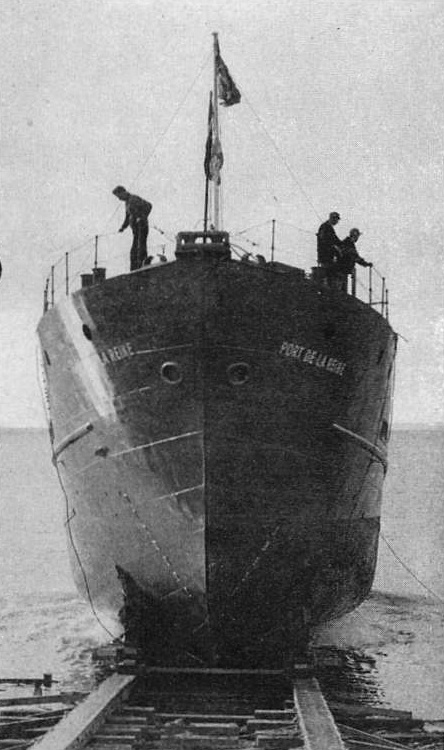
- Launching of Porte de la Reine

History

Canada
- Name: Porte de la Reine
- Builder: Victoria Machinery Depot, Victoria
- Laid down: 4 March 1951
- Launched: 23 July 1952
- Commissioned: 7 December 1952
- Decommissioned: 19 December 1996
- Identification: Pennant number: YNG 184
- Fate: Retired

General characteristics
- Class & type: Porte-class gate vessel
- Displacement: 498 tons
- Length: 125.5 ft (38.3 m)
- Beam: 26.3 ft (8.0 m)
- Draught: 13 ft (4.0 m)
- Speed: 11 kn (20 km/h)
- Complement: 23 (later increased to 45 for training purposes)
- Sensors & processing systems: Mechanical minesweeping equipment (later removed); Boom defence equipment
- Armament: 1 × 40mm Bofors single mount (later removed)

HMCS Porte de la Reine was a Porte-class gate vessel of the Royal Canadian Navy.

== Construction and career ==
Porte de la Reine was built by Victoria Machinery Depot, Victoria, being laid down on 4 March 1951 and launched on 23 July 1952. She was commissioned on 7 December 1952 and like her sister ships, took the name of one of the gates in the fortifications of Quebec or Louisbourg.

Though the class were designed to operate the gates in anti-submarine booms, there was little need for this during the Cold War and Porte de la Reine was placed in reserve in 1957. The class was reactivated in the mid-1960s and used as training vessels for personnel of the Canadian Forces Naval Reserve. Porte de la Reine was based at Esquimalt, British Columbia until being paid off on 19 December 1996 and disposed of.

A notice in the Skagit Valley Herald on Wednesday, 20 March 2013 announced a "Notification of Intent to Obtain Custody". The Washington State Department of Natural Resources intends to "take custody of 2 derelict vessels anchored near Shannon Point in Anacortes, Skagit County, Washington." These vessels are Porte de la Reine and Porte Québec
