= Louisa (Quasi-War privateer) =

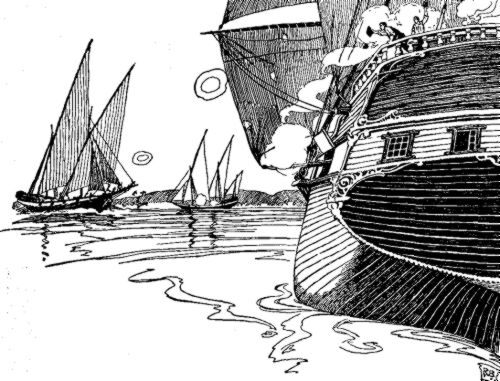
Louisa firing on French privateers from Algeciras.

The Louisa was an American merchant ship that gained fame in 1800 while sailing as a privateer out of Philadelphia, Pennsylvania, during the Quasi-War with France.

The owners of the Louisa obtained a letter of marque that authorized her captain to act against French merchant shipping during the war. She was armed with twelve 6-pounder guns and carried a crew of thirty sailors and officers.

In August 1800 several French privateers that sailed out of Algeciras, in southern Spain, attacked her off Gibraltar. Her captain, Thomas Hoggard (or Thomas Haggard), was wounded and taken below to his cabin. After Louisa repelled the attack, Hoggard was taken ashore at Gibraltar, where he subsequently died.

The USS Haggard (DD-555) was named in honor of the bravery of Louisa's captain and crew in the action off Gibraltar.

== See also ==
- Famous privateers
