= Porte-class gate vessel =

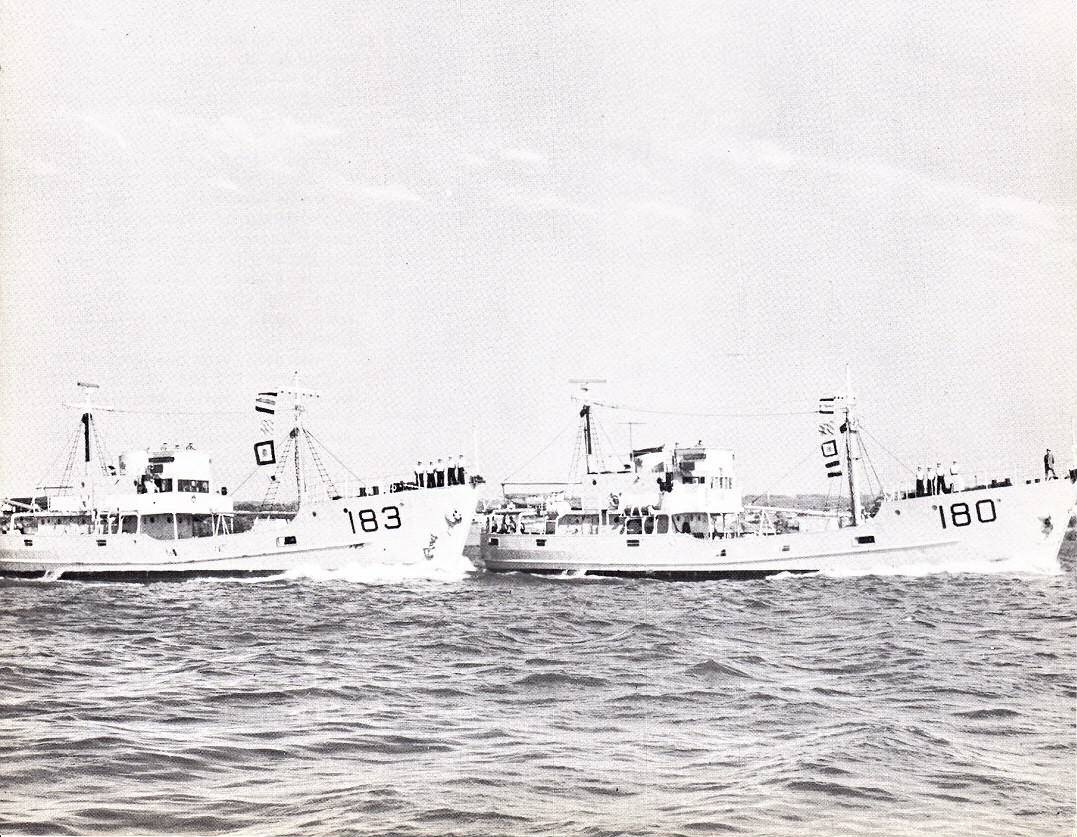
- HMCS Porte St. Louis (left) and Porte St. Jean in 1966

Class overview
- Name: Porte class
- Operators: Royal Canadian Navy / Canadian Maritime Command
- Preceded by: Battle class
- In commission: 5 December 1951 – 19 December 1996
- Completed: 5
- Scrapped: 5

General characteristics
- Type: Boom defence vessel
- Displacement: 429 tons
- Length: 125 ft 6 in (38.3 m)
- Beam: 26 ft 4 in (8.0 m)
- Draught: 13 ft (4.0 m)
- Propulsion: 1 diesel engine, 1 shaft 600 bhp (450 kW)
- Speed: 11 kn (20 km/h)
- Complement: originally 3 officers, 20 ratings; later expanded to 5 officers, 3 officers under training, 30 ratings
- Sensors & processing systems: Mechanical minesweeping equipment (later removed); Boom defence equipment
- Armament: 1 × 40 mm Bofors single mount (later removed)

The Porte-class gate vessels were a class of five boom defence vessels built in the early 1950s and operated by the Royal Canadian Navy (RCN) and Canadian Forces (CF) during the Cold War. The class derived its name from the gates of the French fortifications of Québec and Louisbourg and was designed by the RCN as a replacement for World War I-era Battle-class trawlers used to operate anti-submarine booms during World War II. The Porte class were used primarily as training vessels during the Cold War.

== Design and description ==
The Porte class were designed with the possibility of commercial adoption of the design by the Canadian fishing industry. The gate vessels were planned for use as auxiliary vessels during peacetime. The Porte class was of a trawler design, and were designed to operate the anti-submarine booms for harbour defence. They were also capable of being fitted for minelaying.

The Porte class were 125 feet 6 inches (38.3 m) long with a beam of 26 feet 4 inches (8.0 m) and a draught of 13 feet 0 inches (4.0 m). They displaced 429 long tons (436 t) fully loaded and had an initial complement of 3 officers and 20 ratings. The Porte class were powered one Fairbanks-Morse 6-cylinder diesel engine driving one shaft creating 600 brake horsepower (450 kW). This gave the vessels a maximum speed of 11 knots (20 km/h; 13 mph). The vessels had a range of 4,000 nautical miles (7,400 km; 4,600 mi) at 10 knots (19 km/h; 12 mph). They were equipped with one Racal Decca navigation radar operating on the I band. The ships were armed with one 40 mm gun placed forward.

== Ships ==
Porte class construction data
| Ship | Original pennant number | Final pennant number | Builder | Laid down | Launched | Commissioned | Paid off | Fate |
|---|---|---|---|---|---|---|---|---|
| Porte Dauphine | YMG 186 | YNG 186 | Pictou Foundry Co., Pictou | 15 May 1951 | 4 March 1952 | 10 December 1952 | December 1995 | |
| Porte de la Reine | YMG 184 | YNG 184 | Victoria Machinery Depot, Victoria | 5 March 1951 | 28 December 1951 | 7 October 1952 | 19 December 1996 | Broken up Seattle 2015 |
| Porte Québec | YMG 185 | YNG 185 | Burrard Dry Dock, Vancouver | 15 February 1951 | 28 August 1951 | 19 September 1952 | 19 December 1996 | Broken up Seattle 2015 |
| Porte St. Jean | YMG 180 | YNG 180 | George T. Davie & Sons, Lauzon | 16 May 1950 | 22 November 1950 | 5 December 1951 | 31 March 1996 | |
| Porte St. Louis | YMG 183 | YNG 183 | George T. Davie & Sons, Lauzon | 21 March 1951 | 23 July 1952 | 29 August 1952 | 31 March 1996 | |

== Service history ==
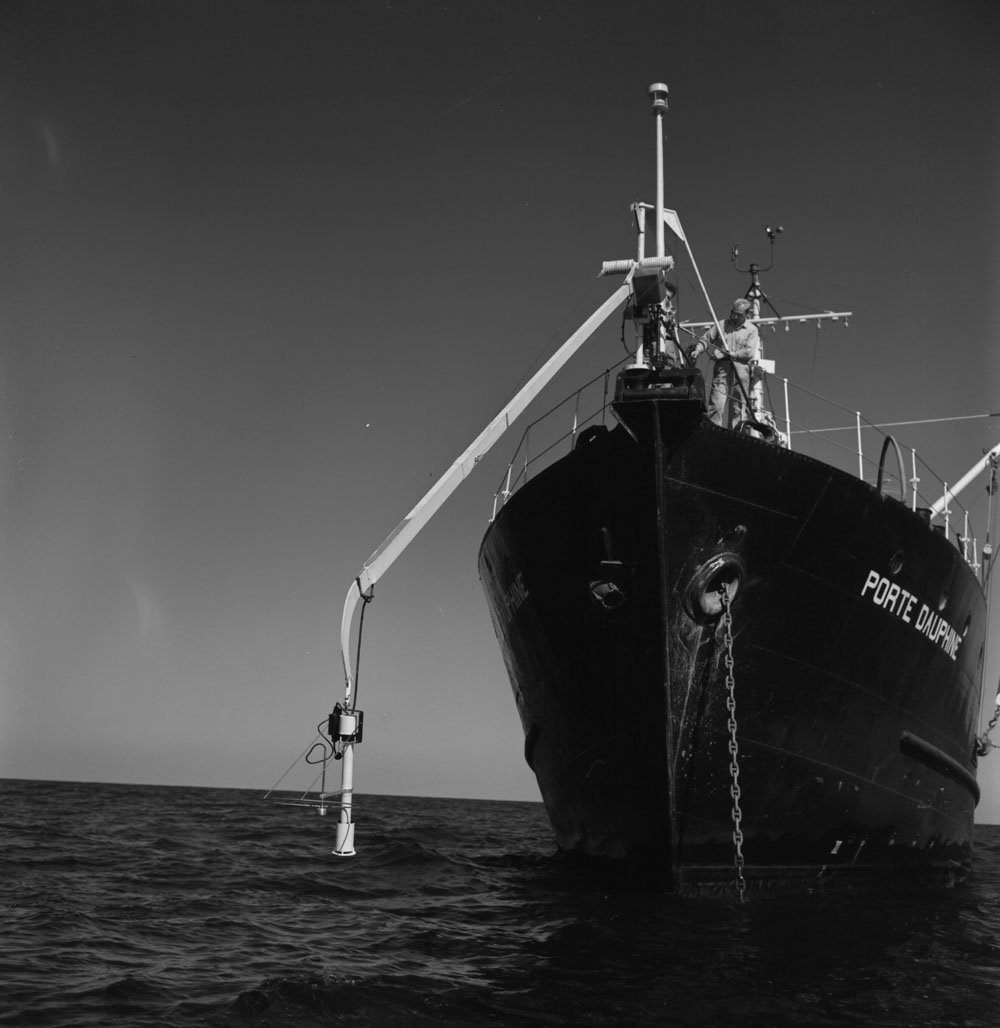
Porte Dauphine conducting environmental research with the Great Lakes Institute in 1961

The first Porte-class vessel was ordered September 1949. Porte Saint Jean and Porte Saint Louis were based at Halifax, Nova Scotia and Porte Dauphine, Porte Québec and Porte de la Reine at Esquimalt, British Columbia. From 1958 to 1974, Porte Dauphine was loaned to the Department of Transport (DOT) as an environmental research ship on the Great Lakes, before transferring to the West Coast via the Panama Canal. Porte Dauphine was modified for DOT use, which involved the installation of a widened wheelhouse and a cafeteria. The vessels were used to train naval reserve crews in key trades such as navigation, diesel mechanics, communications and logistics. Porte Saint Jean and Porte Saint Louis began training on the Great Lakes in 1953, working with HMCS Star in Hamilton, Ontario. They sometimes travelled to Bermuda for training. In 1973, Porte Saint Jean and Porte Saint Louis sailed into the eastern Arctic. With the arrival of the Kingston-class coastal defence vessels in the mid-1990s, the Porte class was retired. Porte Dauphine was the first, discarded in December 1995, followed by Porte Saint Jean and Porte Saint Louis in March 1996 and Porte Québec and Porte de la Reine in December 1996.

== Sources ==
- Blackman, Raymond V. B., ed. (1953). Jane's Fighting Ships 1953–54. London: Sampson, Low and Marston. OCLC 913556389.
- Gimblett, Richard H. & Hadley, Michael L., eds. (2010). Citizen Sailors: Chronicles of Canada's Naval Reserve. Toronto: Dundurn Press. ISBN 978-1-55488-867-2.
- Macpherson, Ken & Barrie, Ron (2002). The Ships of Canada's Naval Forces 1910–2002 (Third ed.). St. Catharines, Ontario: Vanwell Publishing. ISBN 1-55125-072-1.
- Sharpe, Richard, ed. (1990). Jane's Fighting Ships 1990–91 (93 ed.). Surrey, United Kingdom: Jane's Information Group. ISBN 0-7106-0904-3.
