= Lewisville =

Lewisville may refer to the following places:

== Canada ==
- Lewisville, New Brunswick, a former village, now part of the cities of Moncton and Dieppe

== United States ==
- Lewisville, Arkansas
- Lewisville, Idaho
- Lewisville, Indiana
- Lewisville, Minnesota
- Lewisville, Missouri, an extinct hamlet in Lincoln Township, Holt County, Missouri
- Lewisville, New Jersey
- Lewisville, North Carolina
- Lewisville, Oregon
- Lewisville, Texas
- Lewisville, Virginia
- Lewisville, Washington

== See also ==
- Lewisville High School
- Louisville (disambiguation)
- Lewis (disambiguation)
