= Fort St. Louis =

Fort St. Louis or Fort Saint Louis may refer to:

== Canada ==
- Fort Saint Louis (Newfoundland), Placentia, Newfoundland
- Fort Saint Louis, a fort in what is now Moose Factory, Ontario
- Fort St. Louis (Shelburne County, Nova Scotia)
- Fort St. Louis (Guysborough County, Nova Scotia)
- Fort St. Louis, former name of Fort Chambly, Chambly, Quebec
- Fort St. Louis, alternate name of Fort de la Corne in Saskatchewan.

== United States ==
- Fort Saint Louis (Illinois), a French Illinois River fort built by La Salle in 1683 on a butte later known as Starved Rock
- Fort Saint-Louis (Texas), a French colony from 1685 until 1688 near what is now Inez, Texas

== Elsewhere ==
- Fort Saint Louis (Martinique), a 17th-century French fortress in Fort-de-France, Martinique
- Saint-Louis, Senegal, the French colonial capital in Senegal
- Castle of San Luis de Bocachica, a 17th century Spanish fortress that defended Cartagena, Colombia

== See also ==
- Saint Louis (disambiguation)
