= USS Haggard =

Fletcher-class destroyer

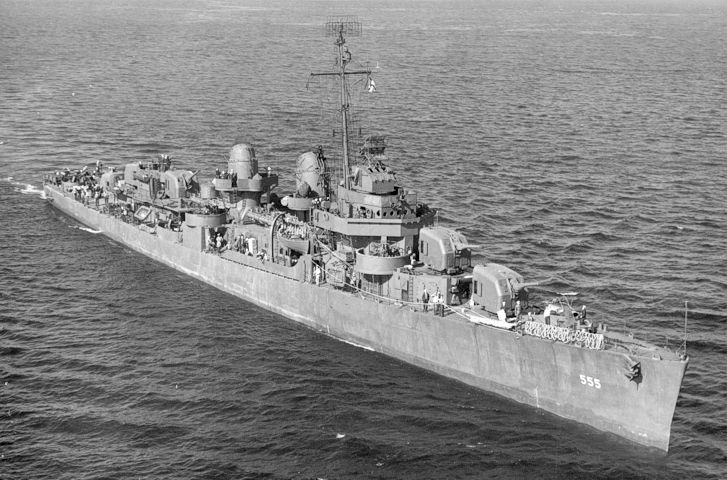
- USS Haggard (DD-555)

History

United States
- Namesake: Captain Thomas Haggard of the Louisa
- Builder: Seattle-Tacoma Shipbuilding Corporation
- Laid down: 27 March 1942
- Launched: 9 February 1943
- Commissioned: 31 August 1943
- Decommissioned: 1 November 1945
- Stricken: 16 November 1945
- Fate: Sold for scrap, 3 March 1946

General characteristics
- Class & type: Fletcher-class destroyer
- Displacement: 2,050 tons
- Length: 376 ft 6 in (114.7 m)
- Beam: 39 ft 8 in (12.1 m)
- Draft: 17 ft 9 in (5.4 m)
- Propulsion: 60,000 shp (45 MW); 2 propellers
- Speed: 35 knots (65 km/h; 40 mph)
- Range: 6500 nmi. (12,000 km) @ 15 kt
- Complement: 273
- Armament: 5 × single Mk 12 5 in (127 mm)/38 guns; 5 × twin 40 mm (1.6 in) Bofors AA guns; 7 × single 20 mm (0.8 in) Oerlikon AA guns; 2 × quintuple 21 in (533 mm) torpedo tubes; 6 × single depth charge throwers; 2 × depth charge racks

USS Haggard (DD-555) was a Fletcher-class destroyer of the United States Navy named for Captain Haggard of the Louisa, who fought in the Second World War.

Haggard was launched by Seattle-Tacoma Shipbuilding Co., Seattle, Wash., 9 February 1943, sponsored by Mrs. E. B. McKinney; and commissioned 31 August 1943.

Haggard departed for shakedown training off California 29 September and after completing it departed Seattle 24 November for Pearl Harbor. The ship arrived 30 November 1943 and spent the next 2 months in tactical exercises with other destroyers in Hawaiian waters. Her first combat operation was to be the forthcoming invasion of the Marshall Islands, next step on the island road to Japan.

== Central Pacific ==
The ship sailed 22 January 1944 for the Marshalls. She covered the unopposed landings on Majuro 31 January and then sailed to Kwajalein Atoll. Taking up firing position inside the lagoon 2 February, she provided gunfire support for the advancing Marines until the island was secured 3 days later. Then Haggard patrolled and escorted transports in the Kwajalein area until sailing for Engebi, Eniwetok Atoll 17–19 February. There the destroyer again provided close fire support with her 5-inch guns, helping to secure Eniwetok. With the Marshalls in American hands, Haggard arrived 7 March at Espiritu Santo, New Hebrides.

For the next months, Haggard operated with 3rd Fleet in the New Guinea-Solomons area. Her duties included reconnaissance patrols, convoying, and screening escort carriers. She also worked occasionally with minecraft and screened a minelaying operation 9 May in the Solomons, passing within 800 yards of an enemy-held beach on Buka Passage. During the night of 16–17 May the destroyer was patrolling with Franks (DD-554) and Johnston (DD-557) when she picked up an underwater sound contact. The three ships delivered depth charge attacks and were jointly credited with the sinking of the Japanese submarine I-176.

Haggard joined 5th Fleet at Eniwetok 21 May to prepare for the Marianas operation, as America's amphibious might pressed across the Pacific. Departing Eniwetok 8 July, Haggard arrived Guam with battleships Pennsylvania (BB-38) and New Mexico (BB-40) and other fleet units 17 July and began a bombardment of the beach fortifications. With the landing on Guam of Marines 21 July, the destroyer turned to close fire support, lending her gunfire to the battle ashore.

Next on the timetable of the Pacific island campaign was the Palau group, needed to provide an airbase for further advances. Haggard was withdrawn from Guam to Espiritu Santo on 24 August 1944 and later joined the Western Escort Carrier Group off the Solomons. During the invasion of Peleliu 15 September Haggard screened carrier groups as they provided bombardment and close fire support for Marines ashore. Aircraft from her group also bombarded Ulithi before the ships returned to Manus' Seeadler Harbor 1 October.

== Philippines ==
Haggard’s next operation was the start of the invasion of the Philippines. She was assigned to an escort carrier group off Samar in support of the invasion of Leyte and the fleet surface actions 23–25 October. A part of Rear Admiral Felix Stump's "Taffy 2" (Task Unit 77.4.2) in the Battle off Samar, Haggard and her group were surprised on the morning of 25 October by units to the northward under Admiral Takeo Kurita heading toward the invasion beaches on Leyte Gulf. As the carriers of "Taffy 3" (TU 77.4.3) retired at top speed, the destroyers, including Hoel (DD-533), Heermann (DD-532), and Johnston, attacked the Japanese at close range, while planes from both carrier groups attacked repeatedly in the hope of diverting the overwhelming Japanese force and allowing the American light units to escape. Haggard took position astern of her carriers to protect them, and took many near misses from the big guns of the Japanese fleet. Although two escort carriers and three destroyers were sunk, the attacks saved the smaller American group and inflicted damage on the attackers. Admiral Kurita decided not to steam into Leyte Gulf and returned northward.

Haggard remained with the escort carrier groups through November during air operations in support of the Philippines campaign. After a brief stay at Ulithi 25 November–10 December, the destroyer joined Task Force 38 (TF 38) in support of the Luzon invasion. Then, 10–20 January 1945, Admiral William Halsey's 3d Fleet made a striking incursion into the South China Sea. With Haggard and other destroyers screening, the carrier groups struck Luzon, Taiwan, Indochina, and mainland China destroying shipping and airfields in a memorable demonstration of mobile sea power.

== Japan ==
The destroyer returned to Ulithi on 26 January 1945 before sailing with Task Group 58.4 (TG 58.4) for strikes against Japan. Departing on 9 February, the group, including carriers Randolph (CV-15) and Yorktown (CV-10), attacked Tokyo on 16–17 February, just before the landings on Iwo Jima. Haggard’s carrier group lent air support to the assault on Iwo Jima until returning to Ulithi on 4 March 1945.

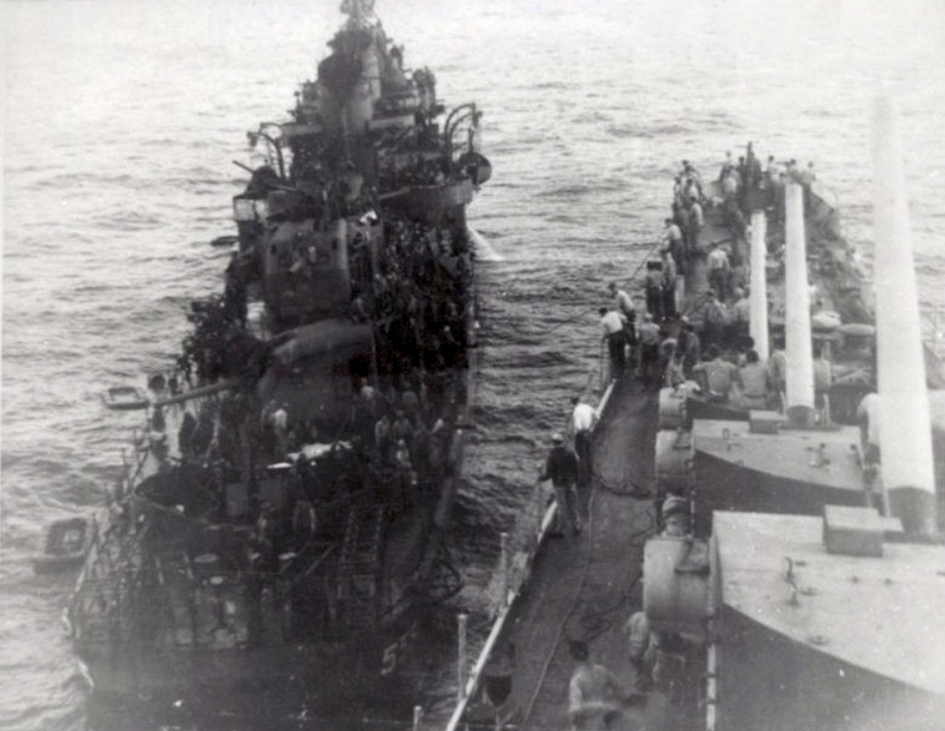
USS San Diego assists Haggard after Haggard was hit by a kamikaze, 29 April 1945.

With the Pacific campaign then reaching its climax, Haggard sortied again with Vice Admiral Marc Mitscher's 5th Fleet carriers for attacks on Japan. During strikes on Honshū on 18–19 March, Japanese suicide planes struck back at the task force. Haggard's gunners shot down several kamikazes, as carriers Franklin (CV-13) and Enterprise (CV-6) were damaged. After fueling at sea, the fast carrier group, moved toward Okinawa on 22 March, with Haggard acting as picket destroyer ahead of the formation. Shortly before midnight she detected a surfaced submarine with radar, and after the submarine dived attacked with depth charges. Ten minutes later the submarine surfaced on Haggard's port beam. Commander Soballe brought his ship into a hard left turn toward the submarine at full speed. Haggard rammed the submarine amidships, sinking it in three minutes. Haggard’s crew then made emergency repairs to her damaged bow and took her back to Ulithi on 25 March. Some accounts have identified the submarine she sank as I-371, but the Japanese had already declared I-371 missing 11 days earlier, and Haggard's victim most likely was Ro-41.

Haggard sailed from Ulithi on 21 April with battleship Iowa (BB-61) to support the Okinawa operation. Again occupied with screening carriers in the area, Haggard and other fleet units were constantly threatened by suicide planes as the Japanese tried desperately to stop the invasion. While proceeding to picket station 29 April the ship was attacked by a kamikaze making a shallow dive to starboard which crashed close aboard and penetrated her hull near the waterline. Soon afterward, her bomb exploded in Haggard's engine room. As water gushed through the hole in the destroyer's side and she began to settle, another suicide plane attacked but was shot down. Damage control brought the flooding under control and Haggard was kept afloat. Wounded were taken by the cruiser San Diego while the destroyer Walker arrived to tow the stricken ship to Kerama Retto, near Okinawa. The ship arrived there on 1 May 1945.

Hampered by lack of materials and almost constant air alerts, Haggard's crew succeeded in repairing her so that she could get underway. She departed Kerama Retto on 18 June 1945 and arrived at Pearl Harbor via Saipan and Guam on 12 July. From there she steamed to San Diego and the Panama Canal Zone, arriving at Norfolk on 5 August 1945. Decommissioned on 1 November 1945, Haggard was scrapped because of war damage.

== Haggard artifacts ==
Following decommissioning, major engineering components were sectioned to allow viewing of the internals and sent to the U.S. Naval Academy as training aids for the education of the Midshipmen. A boiler, a main engine with reduction gear, deaerating feed tank (DFT), and various valves and steam-driven pumps were originally displayed in Isherwood Hall. When Rickover Hall was constructed in the 1970s, the floor plan featured a two-story gallery into which most of the components were relocated (excluding the boiler). Isherwood Hall was demolished in 1981 and the boiler was scrapped. In the 2000s, renovations to Rickover Hall required reduction of the collection including removal of the main engine and reduction gears. The smaller components were shifted to hallways of the ground floor of Rickover Hall and continue to illustrate naval engineering equipment.

== Honors ==
Haggard received twelve battle stars for World War II service. The ship is credited with up to 7 engagements in and around the Pacific during its tour of the war.
