= Tolchester Beach, Maryland =

Unincorporated community in Maryland, United States

- Unincorporated community
- Location within Maryland Location within the United States
- Coordinates: 39°12′51″N 76°14′41″W
- Country: United States
- State: Maryland
- County: Kent
- Elevation: 0 ft (0 m)
- Time zone: UTC-5 (Eastern (EST))
  - Summer (DST): UTC-4 (EDT)
- ZIP code: 21620
- Area codes: 410, 443, and 667
- GNIS feature ID: 595098

Tolchester Beach is an unincorporated community located on the eastern shore of the Chesapeake Bay in Kent County, Maryland, United States. Tolchester Beach is located just north of Rock Hall.

== Amusement park ==
Established in 1877, Tolchester Beach was a popular amusement park and resort during the late 19th and 20th centuries. At its height it saw as many as 20,000 visitors each weekend. It started on 10 acres and eventually expanded to 155 acres. It had a dance hall, a roller coaster called Whirl Pool Dips, bowling alleys, a bingo parlor, a roller skating rink, "the whip", dodgems, pony and goat carts, boat rides, a miniature steam train named Jumbo, novelty and candy shops, and popcorn, ice cream, hot dogs, and kewpie doll stands. Baltimore City residents could easily hop a regular steamship ferry for day trips or stay the night, making Tolchester a main destination for generations. The resort was closed in 1962.

Some of the steamships that served Tolchester Beach were the Emma Giles and Louise.

== See also ==
- Tolchester, Maryland, census-designated place covering most of Tolchester Beach
