= HMS Princess Louisa =

Three ships of the Royal Navy have borne the name HMS Princess Louisa, after Princess Louisa:

- HMS Princess Louisa was a 42-gun fifth rate launched as HMS Launceston in 1711. She was rebuilt in 1728 and renamed HMS Princess Louisa. She was wrecked in 1736.
- HMS Princess Louisa was a 60-gun fourth rate launched as HMS Swallow in 1732 and broken up in 1742.
- HMS Princess Louisa (1744) was a 60-gun fourth rate launched in 1744 and broken up by 1766.
