= Saint-Louis-lès-Bitche =

- Commune
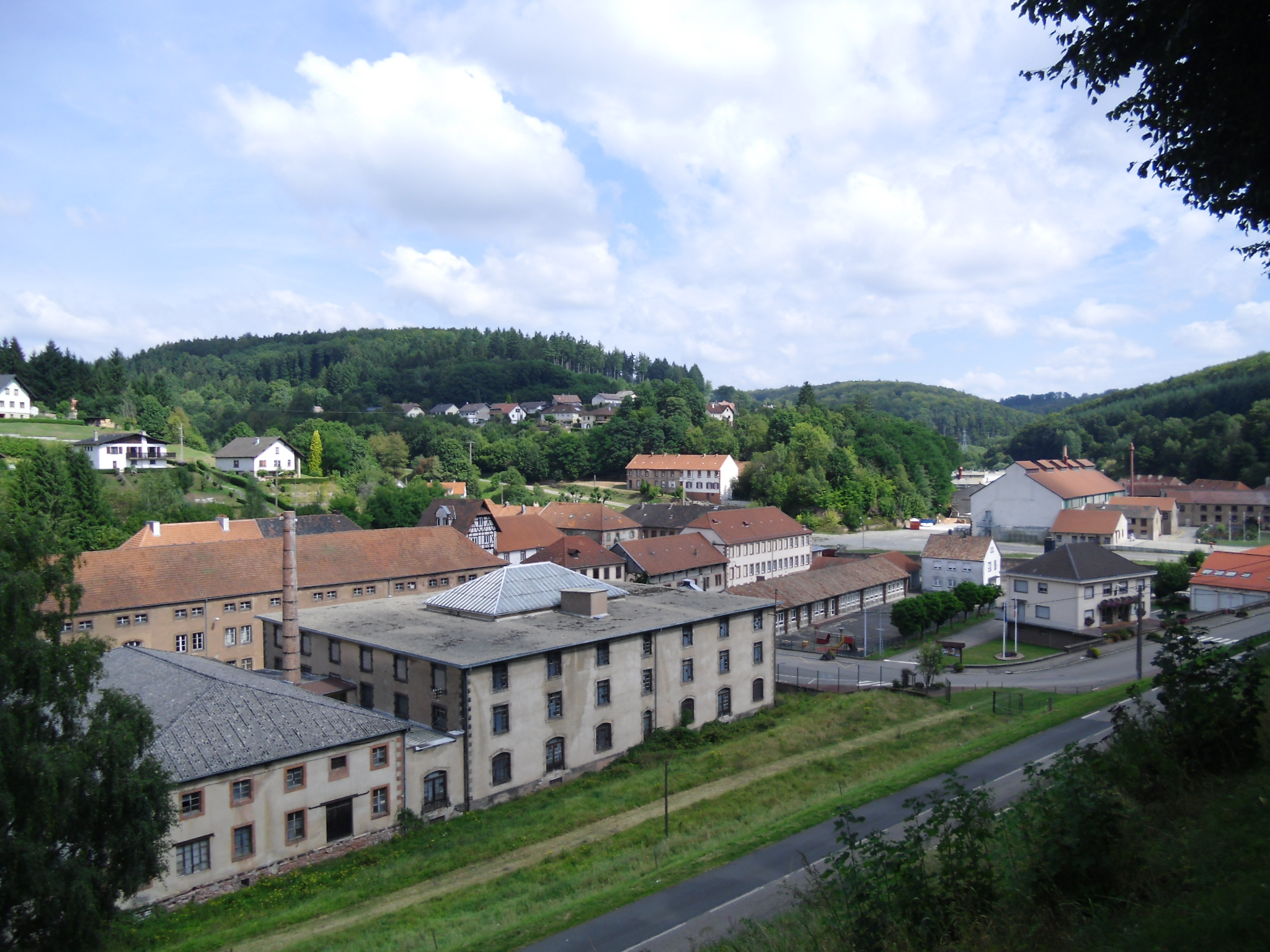
- The glass factory in Saint-Louis-lès-Bitche

- Coat of arms
- Location of Saint-Louis-lès-Bitche
- Location within France Location within Grand Est
- Coordinates: 48°59′20″N 7°21′15″E
- Country: France
- Region: Grand Est
- Department: Moselle
- Arrondissement: Sarreguemines
- Canton: Bitche
- Intercommunality: CC du Pays de Bitche

Government
  - Mayor (2020–2026): Charles Schaeffer
- Area^{1}: 4.53 km^{2} (1.75 sq mi)
- Elevation: 330 m (1,080 ft)
- Highest elevation: 403 m (1,322 ft)
- Lowest elevation: 256 m (840 ft)
- Population (2023): 445
  - Density: 98.2/km^{2} (254/sq mi)
- Time zone: UTC+01:00 (CET)
  - Summer (DST): UTC+02:00 (CEST)
- INSEE/Postal code: 57619 /57620
- ^{1} French Land Register data, which excludes lakes, ponds, glaciers > 1 km^{2} (0.386 sq mi or 247 acres) and river estuaries.

Saint-Louis-lès-Bitche (French pronunciation: [sɛ̃ lwi lɛ bitʃ], literally St. Louis near Bitche; German: Münzthal; Lorraine Franconian: Minzdal) is a commune in the Moselle department of the Grand Est administrative region in north-eastern France.

The village belongs to the Pays de Bitche and to the Northern Vosges Regional Nature Park. As of the 2013 France census, the village's population is 512. The inhabitants of the commune are known as Ludoviciens and Ludoviciennes.

The village is famous for its Saint-Louis Glass Manufacture, as it is the oldest glass manufacturer in France with roots dating back to 1586 and the first crystal glass manufacturer in continental Europe (1781).

== See also ==
- Communes of the Moselle department
- Saint-Louis (glass manufacturer)
