= San Luis Airport =

San Luis Airport may refer to:

- San Luis Airport (Argentina) or Brigadier Mayor César Raúl Ojeda Airport in San Luis, Argentina
- San Luis Airport (Colombia) in Ipiales, Colombia
- San Luis Obispo County Regional Airport in San Luis Obispo, California, United States
- San Luis Río Colorado Airport, in San Luis Río Colorado, Mexico
