= List of shipwrecks in December 1882 =

The list of shipwrecks in December 1882 includes ships sunk, foundered, grounded, or otherwise lost during December 1882.

== 1 December ==
List of shipwrecks: 1 December 1882
Ship	State	Description
Minnie	United Kingdom	The fishing trawler foundered off Berry Head, Devon with the loss of all three crew.
Peters	United States	The steam barge caught fire and sank in Lake Michigan with the loss of thirteen lives.
Selim	United Kingdom	The barque was run down by the steamship Hamsteels (United Kingdom)) and sank 16 nautical miles (30 km) off Start Point, Devon. The pilot and a crewman were drowned, while the rest were landed at Plymouth. Selim was on a voyage from New Zealand to Dunkirk, Nord. France.
Speranza	United Kingdom	The schooner struck the Catscar Rock, north west of Gigha, Inner Hebrides and was wrecked. Her crew survived. She was on a voyage from Ardrossan, Ayrshire to Dublin.

== 2 December ==
List of shipwrecks: 2 December 1882
Ship	State	Description
Enero	Spain	The ship departed from Rotterdam, South Holland, Netherlands for Bilbao. No further trace, reported missing.
Hawk	United Kingdom	The barque was driven ashore at Scarborough, Yorkshire. She was on a voyage from Hamburg, Germany to Newcastle upon Tyne, Northumberland.
John Preston	United Kingdom	The schooner was driven ashore and sank at Morven, Argyllshire. Her crew were rescued. She was on a voyage from Port Dinorwic, Caernarfonshire to Fraserburgh, Aberdeenshire.
R. G. Peters	United States	The barge was destroyed by fire in Lake Michigan with the loss of fourteen lives.

== 3 December ==
List of shipwrecks: 3 December 1882
Ship	State	Description
Glance	United Kingdom	The barque was run into by the steamship John O. Scott (United Kingdom) and sank in the River Thames near Northfleet, Kent with the loss of a crew member. Survivors were rescued by the tug Challenger (United Kingdom). Glance was on a voyage from Hamburg, Germany to London.
Harmonic	United Kingdom	The ship was driven ashore 3 nautical miles (5.6 km) north of Sandlemere, Yorkshire. Her six crew were rescued by rocket apparatus. She was on a voyage from Arendal, Norway to Grimsby, Lincolnshire.
Mary Jones	United Kingdom	The ship ran aground on the Lemon and Ower Sand, in the North Sea and was abandoned. Her crew were rescued by the smack Aid (United Kingdom). Mary Jones was on a voyage from Helsingborg, Sweden to Gloucester.

== 4 December ==
List of shipwrecks: 4 December 1882
Ship	State	Description
Alexandra	United Kingdom	The barque was driven ashore on the Dutch coast and caught fire. Her crew survived. She was on a voyage from New York, United States to Hamburg, Germany.
Rhineland	Germany	The barque ran aground on the Black Middens, off the mouth of the River Tyne. Her crew were rescued by a lifeboat. She was on a voyage from Pensacola, Florida, United States to the River Tyne.

== 5 December ==
List of shipwrecks: 5 December 1882
Ship	State	Description
Castor	Norway	The barque was driven ashore near Mandal.
Catherine and Mary	United Kingdom	The ship foundered off Tynemouth, Northumberland with the loss of all hands.
Ellen	United Kingdom	The schooner was driven ashore at Goswick, Northumberland in a heavy gale. The crew were rescued by the Coastguard. She was on a voyage from Montrose, Angus to Plymouth, Devon with potatoes
Esperance	Netherlands	The schooner was wrecked at Blyth, Northumberland. Her crew survived. She was on a voyage from Dram, Norway to Newcastle upon Tyne, Northumberland.
John Stonard	United Kingdom	The schooner was abandoned off Fishguard, Pembrokeshire. Her crew were rescued by the Fishguard Lifeboat. She was subsequently driven onto the Goodwick Sands.
Llaethliw	United Kingdom	The schooner was abandoned off Fishguard. Her crew were rescued by the Fishguard Lifeboat. She drove on to the Goodwick Sands and was wrecked.
Maerke To	Norway	The barque was driven ashore near Mandal.
Margaret Reid	United Kingdom	The schooner foundered off Johnshaven, Kincardineshire in a heavy gale, with the loss of all five crew. She was on a voyage from Sunderland, County Durham to Inverness, Scotland with coal.
Olaf Kyrre	Norway	The brig was driven ashore at South Shields, County Durham, United Kingdom. Her crew were rescued by the South Shields Lifeboat. Olaf Kyrre was on a voyage from South Shields to Fredrikshald She subsequently broke up.
Rap	United Kingdom	The ship was driven ashore near Mandal. She was on a voyage from Newcastle upon Tyne, Northumberland to Fredrikshald, Norway.
Rhymney	United Kingdom	The steamship ran aground on the Cow Ledge, in the Isles of Scilly. She was on a voyage from Cardiff, Glamorgan to Saint-Nazaire, Loire-Inférieure, France.
Xanthus	United Kingdom	The schooner was abandoned off Fishguard. Her crew were rescued by the Fishguard Lifeboat. She drove onto the Goodwick Sands and was wrecked.
Unnamed	Flag unknown	The ship foundered 3 nautical miles (5.6 km) off Foula, United Kingdom with the loss of all hands.

== 6 December ==
List of shipwrecks: 6 December 1882
Ship	State	Description
Adolph	Sweden	The barque was wrecked on Formentera, Balearic Islands, Spain. Her crew were rescued. She was on a voyage from Umeå to Marseille, Bouches-du-Rhône, France.
Amalie	Denmark	The brigantine was driven ashore and wrecked at Fredrikshavn. She was on a voyage from Svendborg to Folkenborg, Norway.
Anna Helena	Netherlands	The ship was abandoned in the North Sea 160 nautical miles (300 km) off Spurn Point, Yorkshire, United Kingdom. Her crew were rescued by the smack Lusty (United Kingdom). Anna Helena was on a voyage from Riga, Russia to Purmerend, North Holland.
Black Diamond	United Kingdom	The steamship was driven ashore 1 1/2 nautical miles (2.8 km) south of Flamborough Head, Yorkshire. She was on a voyage from London to Sunderland, County Durham. Her sixteen crew were rescued by rocket apparatus. She was subsequently salvaged, repaired and returned to service.
Fiona	United Kingdom	The barque was wrecked on Hale Sands, in the North Sea off the coast of Lincolnshire with the loss of all sixteen crew. She was on a voyage from San Francisco, California, United States to Hull, Yorkshire.
Huntingtower	United Kingdom	The steamship was driven ashore at Ras Ghareb, Egypt. She was on a voyage from Calcutta, India to Marseille, Bouches-du-Rhône, France.
Hygeia	Norway	The ship was driven ashore and wrecked at Berwick upon Tweed, Northumberland, United Kingdom. Her eight crew were rescued. She was on a voyage from Trouville-sur-Mer, Manche, France to Tønsberg.
Maerdo	Norway	The barque was driven ashore and wrecked at Minatitlán, Mexico.
San Fresemann	Netherlands	The schooner was driven ashore at Lemvig, Denmark. She was on a voyage from Danzig, Germany to Rouen, Seine-Inférieure, France.
Sirio	Italy	The barquentine was wrecked on the Goswick Sands, near Berwick-upon-Tweed, Northumberland, United Kingdom with the loss of twelve of the fourteen people on board. She was on a voyage from Newcastle upon Tyne, Northumberland to Bari.
Star of Hope	United Kingdom	The brig was driven ashore at Whitby, Yorkshire. Her crew were rescued by the Whitby Lifeboat. She was on a voyage from a French port to South Shields, County Durham.
Unnamed	France	The lugger foundered in the Atlantic Ocean. Her crew were rescued by a steamship.

== 7 December ==
List of shipwrecks: 7 December 1882
Ship	State	Description
Anders Dedckam	Norway	The barque was driven ashore on Saltholm, Denmark. She was on a voyage from Stettin, Germany to New York, United States. She was refloated with the assistance of a steamship.
Cheval de Troie	(United Kingdom of Great Britain and Ireland) Guernsey	The ship foundered in the North Sea off Flamborough Head, Yorkshire with the loss of five of her crew.
Ecureuil	France	The ship was driven ashore at Hartlepool, County Durham, United Kingdom. Her crew were rescued. She was on a voyage from Calais to Warkworth, Northumberland, United Kingdom.
Edith	United Kingdom	The schooner was run into by Excelsior (United Kingdom) and sank about 3 cables (570m) from Carrick Nath Point, St Mawes, Cornwall.
Edmund	United Kingdom	The brigantine was driven ashore at Middleton, County Durham. Her crew were rescued by the Hartlepool Lifeboat. She was on a voyage from Oskarshamn, Sweden to London.
Focke Decke	Germany	The schooner was driven ashore at Amble, Northumberland, United Kingdom with the loss of her captain. Survivors were rescued by rocket apparatus. She was on a voyage from the River Tyne to Harburg.
Helen	United Kingdom	The ship collided with the schooner Giles Lang (United Kingdom) and sank off The Lizard, Cornwall. Her crew were rescued by Giles Lang.
Hertha	Germany	The brig was driven ashore and wrecked near Mandal, Norway. She was on a voyage from Wisbech, Cambridgeshire, United Kingdom to Stettin.
Imbro	United Kingdom	The ship was driven ashore in Bay Ovens. She was on a voyage from Kiel, Germany to Riga, Russia. She was later refloated with assistance.
Maron	Norway	The schooner was wrecked 1 nautical mile (1.9 km) north of Johnshaven, Aberdeenshire with the loss of all hands.
Mary	France	The ship was wrecked at Marseille, Bouches-du-Rhône, She was on a voyage from "the Guinea Coast" to Marseille.
Matthew Wignall	United Kingdom	The schooner was run into by the barquentine Fonthill (United Kingdom) and was abandoned 8 to 10 nautical miles (15 to 19 km) west north-west of the Longships Lighthouse, Cornwall. Her crew were rescued by Fonthill. Matthew Wignall drifted ashore, bottom up, at the Gassick, between Sennen Cove and St Just in Penwith, Cornwall.
Sotir	Greece	The barque grounded on a rock on the Kits Cairn, near Porthcurno, Cornwall. After 10 or 15 minutes the barque was carried out to sea by the wind and tide. Before the barque foundered, two local boats following the vessel, took off the ten crew and landed them at Porthgwarra. Sotir was on a voyage from Cardiff, Glamorgan, United Kingdom to Syra.

== 8 December ==
List of shipwrecks: 8 December 1882
Ship	State	Description
Emma	United Kingdom	The fishing smack was abandoned in the North Sea off Whitby, Yorkshire. Her crew were rescued by the smack Choice (United Kingdom).
John	United Kingdom	The brig was driven ashore at Middleton, County Durham. Her crew were rescued. She was on a voyage from London to Hartlepool, County Durham.
Orlando	United Kingdom	The fishing smack was driven ashore and wrecked at Whitby. Her crew were rescued.
Romolo	Italy	The ship departd from Liverpool, Lancashire, United Kingdom for Valparaíso, Chile. No further trace, reported missing.
Y. Y.	United Kingdom	The crewless fishing smack was driven ashore and wrecked at Whitby.

== 9 December ==
List of shipwrecks: 9 December 1882
Ship	State	Description
Adroit	United Kingdom	The schooner foundered 10 nautical miles (19 km) north east of The Maidens, off the coast of County Antrim. Her crew survived. She was on a voyage from Aberdovey, Merionethshire to Sligo.
Marima	United Kingdom	The steamship struck a rock and sprang a leak. She was on a voyage from Kurrachee, India to London. She put in to Port Said, Egypt.
Sarah B.	Flag unknown	The barque sprang a leak in the Atlantic Ocean. She was set afire and abandoned by her crew, who were rescued by the barque Mentor (Flag unknown). Sarah B. was on a voyage from Dieppe, Seine-Inférieure, France to New York, United States.

== 10 December ==
List of shipwrecks: 10 December 1882
Ship	State	Description
Ashfield	United Kingdom	The steamship ran aground at Limerick and was severely damaged. She was refloated.
Johanne	United Kingdom	The brigantine was driven ashore at Gibraltar. She was refloated and taken in to Gibraltar.
Largo Bay	United Kingdom	The steamship was driven ashore at Marbella, Spain. She was on a voyage from Savona, Italy to Marbella.
Minima	Greece	The barque was driven ashore and sank at Gibraltar. She was on a voyage from Taganrog, Russia to a British port.
Serafina	Spain	The ship was driven ashore at Gibraltar.
Unnamed	Flag unknown	The derelict ship came ashore in a capsized condition at Blyth, Northumberland, United Kingdom.
Unnamed	Flag unknown	The hulk was driven ashore at Gibraltar.

== 11 December ==
List of shipwrecks: 11 December 1882
Ship	State	Description
Celide R.	United Kingdom	The ship departed from Port Nolloth, Cape Colony for Swansea, Glamorgan. She was subsequently wrecked.
Corrina H. Bishop	United States	The fishing schooner was lost at Shelburne, Nova Scotia, Canada. Her crew were rescued.
Eunice	United Kingdom	The steamship was abandoned in the North Sea. Her crew were rescued. She was on a voyage from Ystad, Sweden to an Irish port.
Patria	Norway	The steamship was driven ashore on Skagen, Denmark.
Waterwitch	United Kingdom	The ship foundered 6 nautical miles (11 km) south of The Stags. Her five crew survived. She was on a voyage from Kilrush, County Clare to Belfast, County Antrim.

== 12 December ==
List of shipwrecks: 12 December 1882
Ship	State	Description
Ada Elizabeth	United Kingdom	The schooner was run into by another vessel and was abandoned 15 nautical miles (28 km) south south west of Caldy Island, Pembrokeshire. Her crew survived.
Arabia, and Kaieteur	Persia; United Kingdom	The steamships collided near "Foa" and were both severely damaged. Kaieteur was on a voyage from Bussorah to London. Both vessels put back to Bussorah.
Bolivar	United Kingdom	The transport ship was wrecked on Cobbler's Reef, off Barbados with the loss of a crew member.
Chancellor	United Kingdom	The ship was damaged by fire at Suez, Egypt. She was on a voyage from Calcutta, India to London.
Edith	United Kingdom	The ship ran aground on the Gore Sand, in the Bristol Channel. She was refloated with the assistance of a tug and towed in to Penarth, Glamorgan.
Louis Henry	France	The brigantine was driven ashore and wrecked at Lydd, Kent, United Kingdom. She was on a voyage from Dunkirk, Nord to Brest, Finistère.
Nathaniel	United Kingdom	The schooner was driven ashore at Aberthaw, Glamorgan.
Nessmore	United Kingdom	The steamship ran aground at Baltimore, Maryland, United States. She was on a voyage from Baltimore to Liverpool, Lancashire. She was refloated and resumed her voyage.
Nova	United Kingdom	The brigantine was wrecked on the Skerweather Sands. Her crew were rescued. She was on a voyage from Dunkirk, Nord, France to Cardiff, Glamorgan.
P. A. Vagliano, and Raglan	United Kingdom	The steamship Raglan was run into by the steamship P. A. Vagliano off Sully Island, Glamorgan. Three minutes after the collision, her boiler exploded and she sank. Her crew were rescued by P. A. Vagliano. Raglan was on a voyage from Bilbao, Spain to Cardiff. P. A. Vagliano was on a voyage from Cardiff to Constantinople, Ottoman Empire. She was severely damaged at the bow and put back to Cardiff.
Unnamed	Flag unknown	The schooner ran aground on the Lay Rock, off the coast of County Down.

== 13 December ==
List of shipwrecks: 13 December 1882
Ship	State	Description
Campeador	Spain	The steamship sank within five minutes after colliding with Knight of the Thistle (United Kingdom) off the Owers Lightship ( Trinity House), near the Isle of Wight, United Kingdom with the loss of three of the nineteen people on board. Survivors were rescued by Knight of Thistle. Campeador was on a voyage from London, United Kingdom to Barcelona.
Drumtochty	United Kingdom	The steamship was driven ashore near Ilfracombe, Devon.
Freia	Norway	The full-rigged ship was driven ashore at Dungeness, Kent, United Kingdom. She was refloated with the assistance of a tug and resumed her voyage.
George W. Stetson	United States	The fishing schooner was wrecked at East Machia, Maine. Her crew were rescued.
Liverpool	United Kingdom	The tug was holed by the propeller of Louise H. (United Kingdom) and sank in the Humber.
Vivienne	United Kingdom	The steamship was driven ashore at Hoek van Holland, South Holland, Netherlands. She was on a voyage from Bilbao, Spain to Rotterdam, South Holland.

== 14 December ==
List of shipwrecks: 14 December 1882
Ship	State	Description
Albrecht	Germany	The barquentine ran ashore on Lundy Island, Devon, United Kingdom. Her crew survived. She was later refloated and towed in to Penarth, Glamorgan, United Kingdom in a severely leaky condition by Ingoldby (United Kingdom).
Alex	Sweden	The ship was driven ashore at Cheswick, Northumberland, United Kingdom. She was on a voyage from Newcastle upon Tyne, Northumberland to Helsingør, Denmark.
Burnswark	United Kingdom	The barque ran ashore on Lundy Island. Her crew survived.
Storjohann	Flag unknown	The barque collided with the steamship Pelaw (United Kingdom) off Lundy Island and became waterlogged. Her crew were rescued by Pelaw. Storjohann was on a voyage from Bordeaux, Gironde, France to Cardiff, Glamorgan, United Kingdom. Storjohann was subsequently taken in tow by a tug with the intention of making for Milford Haven, Pembrokeshire, United Kingdom.

== 15 December ==
List of shipwrecks: 15 December 1882
Ship	State	Description
Crest	United Kingdom	The steamship was wreckded on San Sebastian Island. Her crew were rescued. She was on a voyage from Santos, Brazil to New York, United States.
Glad Tidings	Canada	The ship ran ashore to the west of Prawle Point, Devon, United Kingdom with the loss of two of her twenty crew. Survivors were rescued by the coastguard using rocket apparatus. Glad Tidings was on a voyage from Calcutta, India to Amsterdam, North Holland, Netherlands.
Langrigg Hall	United Kingdom	The barque hit the Tuscar Rock and sank with the loss of 24 of her 26 crew. She was on a voyage from Liverpool, Lancashire to Calcutta.
Lilian Hill	United Kingdom	The schooner collided with the steamship Ernest (United Kingdom) in Mount's Bay, Cornwall and sank. Her crew were rescued by Ernest. Lilian Hill was on a voyage from Great Yarmouth, Norfolk to Limerick.
Trio	United Kingdom	The ship was driven ashore at Sunderland, County Durham.

== 16 December ==
List of shipwrecks: 16 December 1882
Ship	State	Description
Arandhu	United Kingdom	The steamship ran aground in the Clyde at Battery Point.
Astarte	United Kingdom	The steamship ran aground on Neckman's Bank, in the Baltic Sea. She was on a voyage from Reval, Russia to Hull, Yorkshire.
Effort	United Kingdom	The Thames barge collided with Norman (United Kingdom) and sank in the River Thames at Gravesend, Kent.
Rook	United Kingdom	The steamship ran aground in the Clyde at Port Glasgow, Renfrewshire.

== 17 December ==
List of shipwrecks: 17 December 1882
Ship	State	Description
Emily	United Kingdom	The steam launch sank in the Dornoch Firth.
Ethiopia	United Kingdom	The steamship ran aground on the Cairn Agariff Bank, in Lough Foyle. She was on a voyage from New York, United States to Glasgow, Renfrewshire.
Haven	Norway	The barque was run into by the steamship Cyanus (United Kingdom) and sank off Folkestone, Kent, United Kingdom. Her crew were rescued by Cyanus. Haven was on a voyage from Bridgwater to Tvedestrand.
Unnamed	United Kingdom	The ship was driven ashore at Kincardine-on-Forth, Kincardineshire, United Kingdom with the loss of all hands.

== 18 December ==
List of shipwrecks: 18 December 1882
Ship	State	Description
Cartago Neva	Spain	The steamship caught fire and was beached at Antwerp, Belgium. She was on a voyage from Cartagena to Antwerp. The fire was extinguished.

== 19 December ==
List of shipwrecks: 19 December 1882
Ship	State	Description
Annie Ada	United Kingdom	The barquentine ran aground on the Long Rock, off the coast of County Antrim. She was on a voyage from Ayr to Dublin.
Ottercaps	United Kingdom	The barque was driven ashore 3 nautical miles (5.6 km) north of Sandlemere, Yorkshire. Her crew were rescued by rocket apparatus. She was on a voyage from Rotterdam, South Holland, Netherlands to South Shields, County Durham.
Strathallen	United Kingdom	The steamship was driven ashore at Ballywater, County Down. She was on a voyage from Glasgow, Renfrewshire to Dublin.

== 21 December ==
List of shipwrecks: 21 December 1882
Ship	State	Description
Glencoe	United Kingdom	The ship departed from Pisagua, Peru for a British port. No further trace, reported overdue.

== 22 December ==
List of shipwrecks: 22 December 1882
Ship	State	Description
Arabian	United Kingdom	The steamship ran aground at Malta. She was on a voyage from Alexandria, Egypt to Liverpool, Lancashire.
Gerda	Sweden	The schooner was driven ashore and wrecked at Thisted, Denmark. She was on a voyage from Alloa, Clackmannanshire, United Kingdom to Gothenburg.

== 23 December ==
List of shipwrecks: 23 December 1882
Ship	State	Description
Rosy Morn	United Kingdom	The ship departed from Port Royal, South Carolina, United States for Newport, Monmouthshire. No further trace, reported missing.

== 25 December ==
List of shipwrecks: 25 December 1882
Ship	State	Description
Forth	United Kingdom	The steam dredger was driven ashore in Loch Alsh. Her crew were rescued. She was on a voyage from the Clyde to Grangemouth, Stirlingshire.

== 26 December ==
List of shipwrecks: 26 December 1882
Ship	State	Description
Excel	United Kingdom	The ship departed from Pernambuco, Brazil for a British port. No further trace, reported overdue.

== 27 December ==
List of shipwrecks: 27 December 1882
Ship	State	Description
Canaan	Austria-Hungary	The barque was driven ashore at Port St. Mary, Isle of Man. She was on a voyage from Taganrog, Russia to Liverpool, Lancashire, United Kingdom. She subsequently broke up.
Carvedras	United Kingdom	The schooner sprang a leak and sank about 5 nautical miles (9.3 km) south west of the Longships Lighthouse, Cornwall. Her crew took to the ship's boat and were rescued by the St Ives Lifeboat, about 2 nautical miles (3.7 km) off St Ives, Cornwall. Carvedras was on a voyage from Saundersfoot, Pembrokeshire to Truro, Cornwall.
Holland	Netherlands	The steamship was severely damaged by fire at Rotterdam, South Holland. She was beached.
Lady Havelock, and South of Ireland	United Kingdom	The steamships collided at Havre de Grâce, Seine-Inférieure, France and were both severely damaged.
New England	New South Wales	The steamship sank after hitting a bar in the Clarence River. Sixteen or 24 of the 53 people on board drowned.
San Domingo	United Kingdom	The steamship ran aground off the Nash Lighthouse, Glamorgan. She was refloated.
Unnamed	Flag unknown	The steamship was driven ashore at Bannow Point, County Waterford, United Kingdom.

== 28 December ==
List of shipwrecks: 28 December 1882
Ship	State	Description
Vigilant	Norway	The brig was driven ashore on Inchkeith, Fife, United Kingdom. Her crew were rescued. She was on a voyage from East Wemyss, Fife to Christiania.

== 29 December ==
List of shipwrecks: 29 December 1882
Ship	State	Description
Rescue	(United Kingdom of Great Britain and Ireland) Jersey	The ship departed from London for Jersey. No further trace, reported missing.

== 30 December ==
List of shipwrecks: 30 December 1882
Ship	State	Description
Chiapas	United Kingdom	The steamship sprang a leak and foundered in the Irish Sea 7 nautical miles (13 km) off Roche's Point, County Cork with the loss of a crew member. She was on her maiden voyage, from Glasgow, Renfrewshire to the West Indies.
La Mer	France	The ship departed from Lannion, Côtes-du-Nord for Les Sables-d'Olonne, Vendée. No further trace, reported overdue.
Primus	United Kingdom	The steamship foundered in the North Sea 3 nautical miles (5.6 km) off Lindisfarne, Northumberland. Her crew survived. She was on a voyage from Sunderland, County Durham to Dundee, Forfarshire.

== Unknown date ==
List of shipwrecks: Unknown date in December 1882
Ship	State	Description
Accrington Lass	United Kingdom	The schooner left Douglas, Isle of Man on 4 December. Presumed subsequently foundered with the loss of all four crew; wreckage was reported at the mouth of the River Dee.
Alliance	Flag unknown	The ship was wrecked at Cette, Hérault, France. She was on a voyage from Saint John, New Brunswick, Canada to Cette.
Andreas	Denmark	The schooner was driven ashore and wrecked on the Rowcarrs Rocks, off the coast of Northumberland, United Kingdom. Her crew were rescued by the Blyth Lifeboat. Andreas was on a voyage from Dunkirk, Nord, France to Blyth, Northumberland.
Ann Waters	United Kingdom	The schooner ran aground on the Cockle Sand, in the North Sea off the coast of Norfolk. She was refloated with the assistance of a tug and resumed her voyage.
Ardancorrach	United Kingdom	The steamship was damaged by fire at Galveston, Texas, United States.
Bertha Bahirus	Germany	The barque was abandoned in the Atlantic Ocean. Her crew were rescued by the steamship Rio (Germany). Bertha Bahirus was on a voyage from Cardiff to the Cape Verde Islands. She was towed in to Lisbon, Portugal on 14 December by Rio.
Blink Bonny	United Kingdom	The schooner was driven ashore at Falcone, Sicily, Italy. Her crew were rescued. She was on a voyage from Genoa, Italy to Patras, Greece.
Carfin	United Kingdom	The steamship ran aground at Bilbao, Spain. Her crew were rescued.
Carlotte	Flag unknown	The ship was abandoned in the Atlantic Ocean.
Catherine	United Kingdom	The ship was driven ashore at Portsoy, Banffshire. She was refloated and put back to Portsoy.
Clandon	United Kingdom	The steamship was driven ashore at Petten, North Holland, Netherlands. She was on a voyage from New Orleans, Louisiana, United States to Bremen, Germany. She was later refloated and resumed her voyage.
Cypher	United Kingdom	The schooner was driven ashore at Burnham-on-Sea, Somerset. She was refloated and taken in to Bridgwater, Somerset.
Daisy	United Kingdom	The schooner was driven ashore at Barsallock Point, Inverness-shire. She was on a voyage from Fort William, Inverness-shire to Preston, Lancashire.
David	United Kingdom	The smack foundered in Ramsey Sound. Her crew were rescued. She was on a voyage from Milford Haven, Pembrokeshire to Cardigan.
De Gray	Flag unknown	The ship foundered in the Gulf of Kutch. She was on a voyage from Kotri to Kurrachee and Calcutta, India.
Earl of Ulster	United Kingdom	The steamship ran aground in the River Laggan. Her passengers were taken off by a tug. She was on a voyage from Fleetwood, Lancashire to Belfast, County Antrim.
Eliza	United Kingdom	The schooner was driven ashore at Lindisfarne, Northumberland. She was on a voyage from Sunderland, County Durham to Inverkeithing, Fife.
Elizabeth	Norway	The schooner was driven ashore 3 nautical miles (5.6 km) west of Redheugh, Northumberland. Her crew were rescued by rocket apparatus.
Ella	Germany	The ship was abandoned in the Atlantic Ocean. Eight of her crew were rescued by the barque Monte St. Angelo (Italy).
Flid	Norway	The schooner was driven ashore near South Shields, County Durham, United Kingdom. Her crew were rescued.
Furnessia	United Kingdom	The steamship was driven ashore on the South West Spit. She was on a voyage from Glasgow, Renfrewshire to New York, United States.
Hesper	United Kingdom	The steamship was driven ashore on the coast of Texas, United States. She was on a voyage from Liverpool, Lancashire to Galveston.
Hollander	Netherlands	The steamship was driven ashore at Maassluis, South Holland. She was on a voyage from Bordeaux, Gironde, France to Rotterdam, South Holland.
H Todger	Flag unknown	The schooner was wrecked on Lake Ontario with the loss of nine lives.
Hutton	United Kingdom	The steamship was driven ashore on Perim, Aden Settlement. She was on a voyage from Bombay, India to Port Said Egypt.
Idris	United Kingdom	The schooner was abandoned in the Irish Sea. She was on a voyage from London to Londonderry. She came ashore 1 1/2 nautical miles (2.8 km) south of Garren Point, County Antrim.
Johan	Germany	The barque was driven ashore at Hasle, Bornholm, Denmark. She was on a voyage from New York to Danzig. She was refloated and taken in to Rønne, Denmark.
Johannes	Germany	The schooner was abandoned in the North Sea. Her crew were rescued by the smack Liberal (United Kingdom). Johannes was on a voyage from Riga, Russia to London.
Leonard	Russia	The full-rigged ship was driven ashore on Vlieland, Friesland, Netherlands. She was on a voyage from Hamburg, Germany to Batavia, Netherlands East Indies.
Liddesdale	United Kingdom	The steamship was driven ashore at St. Shott's, Newfoundland Colony before 5 December. She was on a voyage from New Orleans to Reval, Russia.
Lively	United Kingdom	The schooner ran aground on the Bembridge Ledge, off the Isle of Wight. She was on a voyage from Swansea, Glamorgan to a French port.
Louisa	United Kingdom	The brig sailed from Hobart, Tasmania for Melbourne, Victoria on 16 December and was last seen the following day off Bicheno, in bad weather. On 5 March 1883 an upturned floating hull, believed to be that of Louisa, was encountered 33 nautical miles (61 km) off Cape Barren Island, Bass Strait.
Louise	Sweden	The brig ran aground at the Mumbles, Glamorgan and became leaky. She was taken in to Swansea for repairs.
Madamen	United Kingdom	The ship was driven ashore at "Aggerby", Denmark. She was on a voyage from Wisbech, Cambridgeshire to Christiania, Norway.
Maddalena Seconda	Italy	The barque was driven ashore near Wachapreague, Virginia, United States. She was later refloated and taken in to Fortress Monroe.
Nicoline	Norway	The brigantine was lost before 7 December. She was on a voyage from Marseille, Bouches-du-Rhône, France to Rosario, Brazil.
Nilo	United Kingdom	The brig was abandoned in the Atlantic Ocean before 15 December. Her crew were rescued by the yacht Janira (United Kingdom). Nilo was on a voyage from Lisbon, Portugal to Kirkcaldy, Fife.
Nina	United Kingdom	The brigantine was wrecked on the Scar Sands. Her six crew survived.
Sagar	United Kingdom	The ship ran aground on the Middle Sand, in the North Sea off the coast of Essex. She was refloated with assistance from Queen Victoria (United Kingdom).
San Fernando	United Kingdom	The barque was wrecked on the Morant Cays. Her crew were rescued. She was on a voyage from Saint Thomas, Virgin Islands to Belize City, British Honduras.
Santa Lucia	Flag unknown	The ship was wrecked at San Antonio.
Scottish Chief	United Kingdom	The barque ran aground on the Gunfleet Sand, in the North Sea off the coast of Essex. She was refloated with assistance from the smacks Cupid and volunteer, and the tugs Harwich and Robert Owen (all United Kingdom).
Sophia	United Kingdom	The schooner was driven ashore in Cloghy Bay. She was on a voyage from Portmadoc, Caernarfonshire to Portrush, County Antrim.
Southern Monarch	New South Wales	The ship was driven ashore and severely damaged at Madras, India. Her crew were rescued. She was on a voyage from Newcastle to Madras. She had become a wreck by 26 December.
Strathearn	United Kingdom	The steamship was driven ashore at Donaghadee, County Down. She was later refloated and taken in to Greenock, Renfrewshire.
Zambezi	Netherlands	The brigantine was driven ashore and wrecked at Durban, Natal Colony.
Zinga	Canada	The ship was driven ashore in the Gut of Canso. She was on a voyage from Charlottetown, Prince Edward Island to Liverpool.
Unnamed	Norway	The schooner was found by the fishing smack Victor (United Kingdom). An attempt to save her crew failed when a heavy sea swamped Victor's boat with three of the rescued crew on board.
Unnamed	Russia	The steamship collided with the steamship Spearman (United Kingdom) and sank in the Danube at Sulina, Romania with the loss of three lives.
Unnamed	Flag unknown	The steamship was driven ashore and wrecked on Ameland, Friesland.
