= Louise (steamship) =

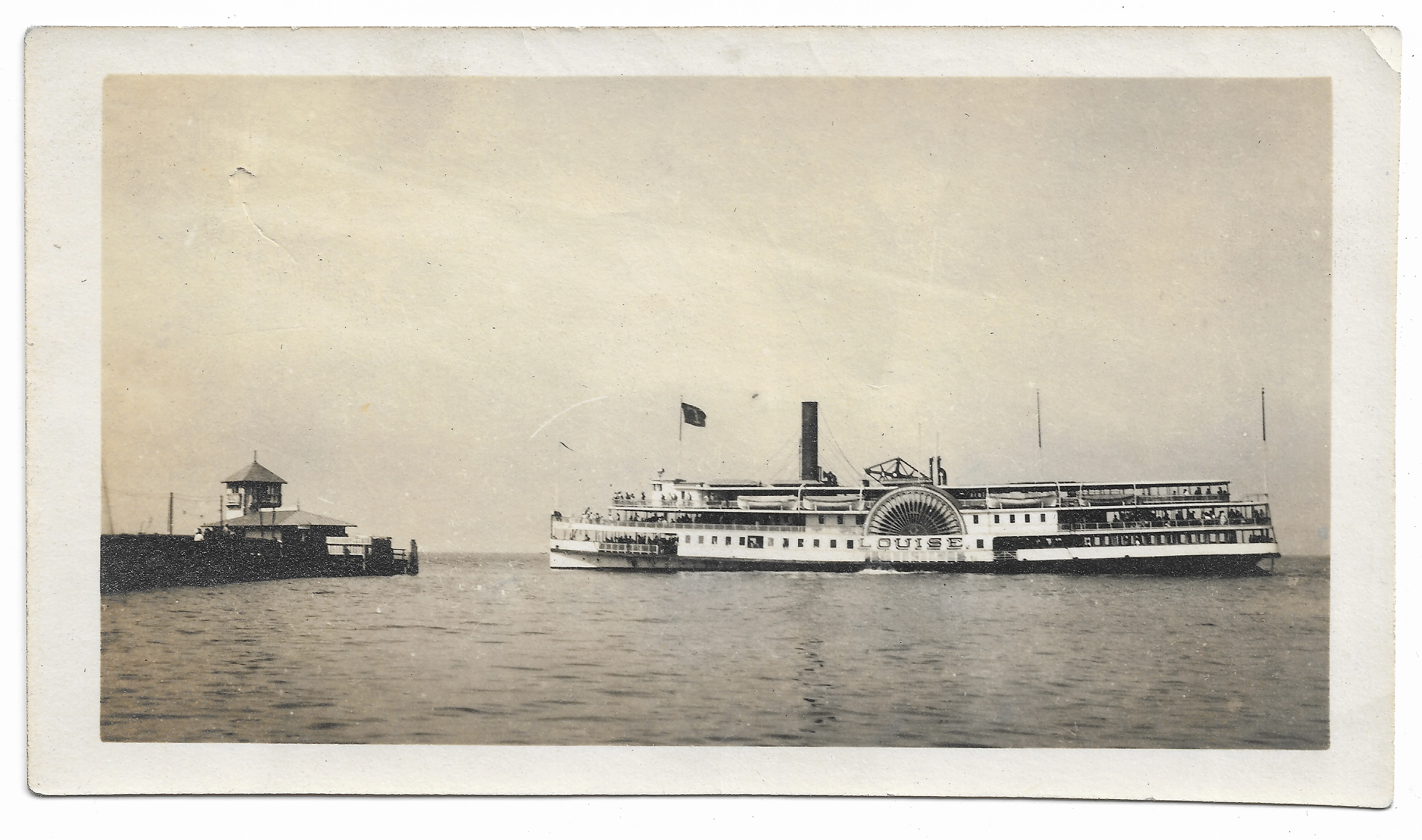
- Louise at Tolchester Beach, Maryland

History
- Name: Louise
- Operator: Tolchester Steamboat Company
- Route: Chesapeake Bay
- Acquired: 1882

General characteristics
- Type: Paddle steamer
- Capacity: 2,500 passengers

Louise was a sidewheel passenger steamer that operated on the Chesapeake Bay for 40 years.

It operated from Pier 15 at Light Street in Baltimore, Maryland and served destinations including Tolchester Beach, Maryland.
