= The Spirit of St. Louis (disambiguation) =

The Spirit of St. Louis is the aircraft flown by Charles Lindbergh on the first non-stop solo trans-Atlantic flight in 1927.

The Spirit of St. Louis may also refer to:

- The Spirit of St. Louis (book), a 1953 book by Lindbergh about the flight
- The Spirit of St. Louis (film), a 1957 film based on the book, starring James Stewart
- The Spirit of St. Louis (album), a 2000 album by The Manhattan Transfer
- Spirit of St. Louis (album), a 1981 album by Ellen Foley
- The Spirit of St. Louis (EP), a 2004 EP by British Sea Power
  - "The Spirit of St. Louis", a song by British Sea Power from their 2002 single "The Lonely" and the aforementioned EP
- Spirit of St. Louis (train), a passenger train operated by Penn Central and later Amtrak
- Spirit of St. Louis Airport, a general aviation airport located west of St. Louis, Missouri, U.S.
- Spirits of St. Louis, an American Basketball Association team
- Spirit of St. Louis, a Continental Hockey League team
