= Saint-Louis (glass manufacturer) =

French manufacturer of fine crystal

Coordinates: 48.9876°N 7.3556°E

Compagnie des Cristalleries de Saint Louis
- Company type: part of Hermès International S.A.
- Founded: 1586
- Headquarters: Saint-Louis-lès-Bitche, Lorraine, France
- Area served: Worldwide
- Products: glass
- Website: www.saint-louis.com

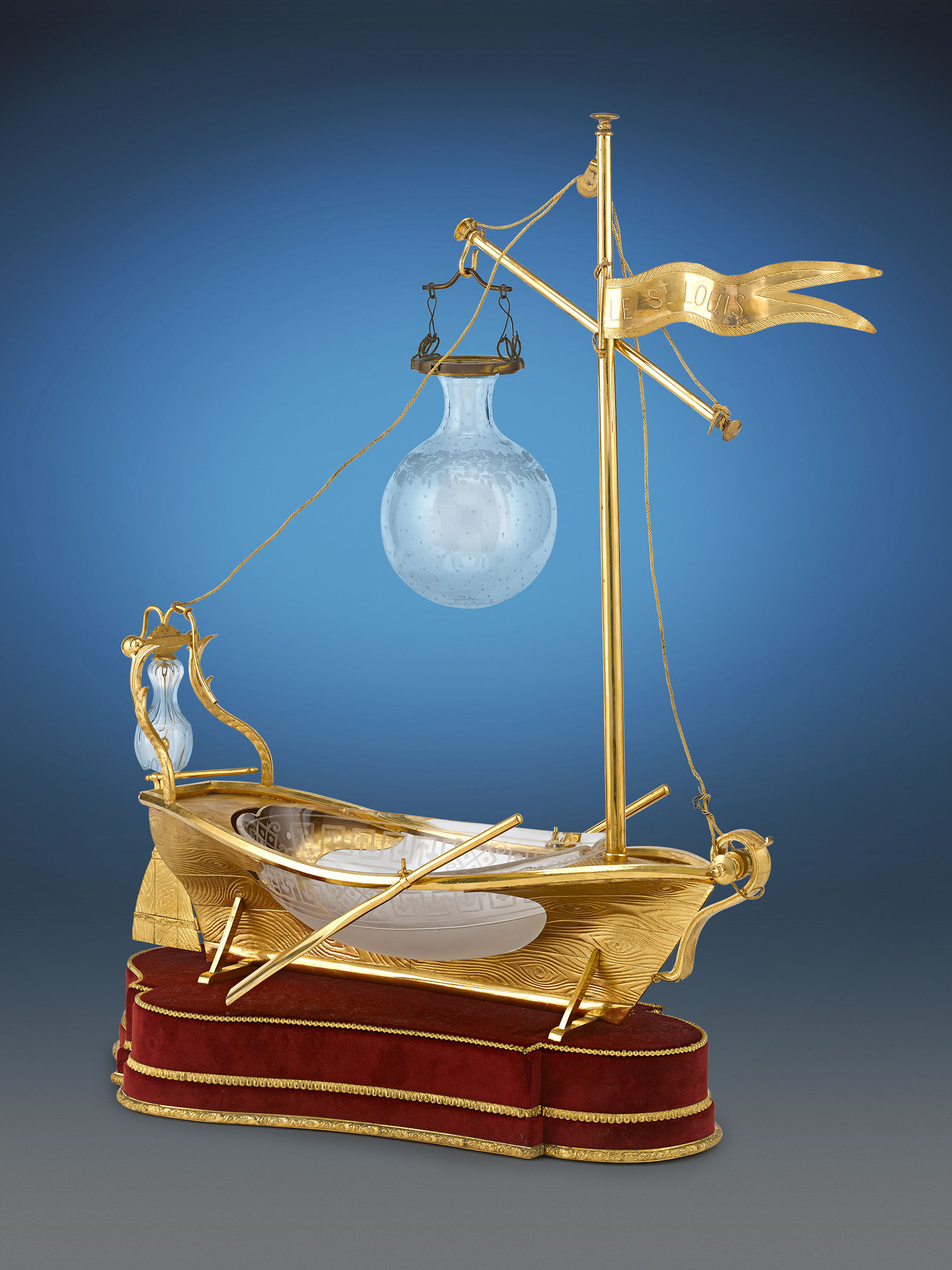
Saint Louis French Crystal Nef Centerpiece exhibited at the 1889 Exposition Universelle in Paris. Circa 1887

The Compagnie des Cristalleries de Saint Louis is a corporation, founded in 1586 in Münzthal (Saint-Louis-lès-Bitche in French) in Lorraine. It is the oldest glass manufacturer in France with roots dating back to 1586 and the first crystal glass manufacturer in continental Europe (1781).

The Musée du cristal Saint-Louis exhibits 4 centuries of technical developments and artistic creations of the Saint-Louis factory. It is housed in one of the production halls of the factory, in Saint-Louis-lès-Bitche.

== See also ==
- Saint-Gobain
