= São Luís =

São Luís or São Luiz (Portuguese language for Saint Louis) may refer to several places in the Portuguese-speaking world:

== Brazil ==
- São Luís, Maranhão. Capital of Maranhão.
- São Luís de Montes Belos. Municipality of Goiás.
- São Luiz do Paraitinga. Municipality of São Paulo.
- São Luiz, Roraima. Municipality of Roraima state.
- São Luiz Gonzaga. Municipality of Rio Grande do Sul state.
- São Luiz, São José Neighborhood of São José, Santa Catarina
- Jardim São Luiz. Neighborhood and district of São Paulo
- São Luís do Quitunde
- São Luís do Curu
- São Luís Gonzaga do Maranhão
- São Luís do Piauí
- São Luís do Paraitinga

== Portugal ==
- São Luís (Portugal), a parish in the municipality of Odemira in Beja

== Rivers ==
- Rio São Luiz, a river in Acre, Brazil

== See also ==
- List of cities in Brazil
- San Luis (disambiguation)
