= ARA San Luis =

Several ships of the Argentine Navy have been named ARA San Luis (or San Luis before the 1860s):

- San Luis (1814), a felucca that served in the second Argentine squadron during the Independence War
- ARA San Luis (1911), a San Luis-class destroyer originally ordered by Argentina that was purchased by Greece (as Aetos) in 1912 before delivery
- ARA San Luis (D-10), a Buenos Aires-class destroyer, in service with Argentina 1938 to 1971
- ARA San Luis (S-32), a Type 209 submarine in service with Argentina from 1974 to 1997
