= St. Louis Airport =

St. Louis Airport may refer to:

- One of six airports in the Greater St. Louis Area
  - St. Louis Lambert International Airport in St. Louis County, Missouri, United States (FAA/IATA: STL)
  - MidAmerica St. Louis Airport in Belleville, Illinois, United States (FAA/IATA: BLV)
  - St. Louis Downtown Airport in Cahokia, Illinois, United States (FAA/IATA: CPS)
  - St. Louis Regional Airport in Alton, Illinois, United States (FAA/IATA: ALN)
  - Spirit of St. Louis Airport in Chesterfield, Missouri, United States (FAA/IATA: SUS)
  - St. Louis Metro-East Airport, also known as Shafer Field, in St. Jacob, Illinois, United States (FAA: IL48)
- Saint-Louis Airport in Saint-Louis, Senegal (FAA/IATA: XLS)
