= St. Louis Cathedral =

St. Louis Cathedral or Cathedral of St. Louis may refer to:

- Cathedral of St Louis (Plovdiv), Bulgaria
- Cathedrale Saint-Louis de Blois, Blois, France
- Cathedral of Saint-Louis des Invalides, Paris, France
- Cathedrale Saint-Louis de la Rochelle, La Rochelle, France
- Saint Louis Cathedral of Versailles, or Versailles Cathedral, France
- St. Louis the King Cathedral, Haifa, Israel
- St. Louis Cathedral, Beirut, Lebanon
- St. Louis Cathedral, Fort-de-France, Martinique, France
- St. Louis Cathedral, Port-Louis, Mauritius
- St. Louis Cathedral (Saint-Louis, Senegal)
- Saint Louis Cathedral (Carthage), or Acropolium of Carthage, Tunisia
- St. Louis Cathedral (New Orleans), Louisiana, U.S.
- Basilica of St. Louis, King of France, formerly Cathedral of St. Louis, St. Louis, Missouri, U.S.
- Cathedral Basilica of Saint Louis (St. Louis), Missouri, U.S.
