= HMCS Porte St. Louis =

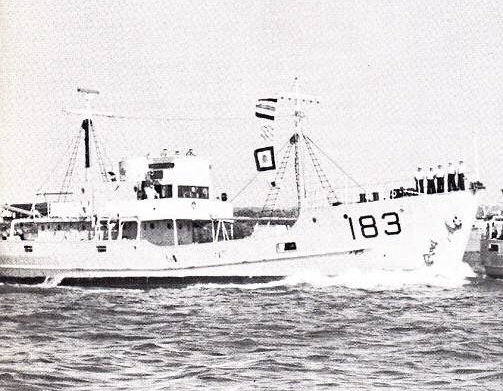
- HMCS Porte St. Louis in Hamilton harbour, 1966

History

Canada
- Name: Porte St. Louis
- Builder: Davie Shipbuilding, Lauzon
- Laid down: 21 March 1951
- Launched: 23 July 1952
- Commissioned: 29 August 1952
- Decommissioned: 1 September 1995
- Identification: Pennant number: YMG 183
- Fate: Retired

General characteristics
- Class & type: Porte-class gate vessel
- Displacement: 498 tons
- Length: 125.5 ft (38.3 m)
- Beam: 26.3 ft (8.0 m)
- Draught: 13 ft (4.0 m)
- Speed: 11 kn (20 km/h)
- Complement: 23 (later increase to 35 for training purposes)
- Sensors & processing systems: Mechanical minesweeping equipment (later removed); Boom defence equipment
- Armament: 1 × 40mm Bofors single mount (later removed)

HMCS Porte St. Louis was a Porte-class gate vessel of the Royal Canadian Navy.

== Construction and career ==
Porte St. Louis was built by George T. Davie & Sons, Lauzon, being laid down on 21 March 1951 and launched on 23 July 1952. She was commissioned on 29 August 1952 and like her sister ships, took the name of one of the gates in the fortifications of Quebec or Louisbourg.

Though the class were designed to operate the gates in anti-submarine booms, there was little need for this during the Cold War and most of the class was placed in reserve in the late 1950s. The class was reactivated in the mid-1960s and used as training vessels for personnel of the Canadian Forces Naval Reserve at Fleet School Hamilton, Ontario. Porte St. Louis was based at Halifax, Nova Scotia until being paid off on 1 September 1995 and disposed of.
