= Hired tender Louisa =

The Hired tender Louisa served the British Royal Navy from 24 April 1803 to 1809. She was of 120 1/94 tons (bm) and was armed with four 3-pounder guns and six ½-pounder swivel guns.

On 28 October 1807 Louisa, under the command of Lieutenant Joseph Hoy, engaged with a privateer of 14 guns. Hoy received promotion to Commander for this action. At the time of the engagement Louisa was armed with fouor 3-pounder guns had a crew of only 8 men. The Admiralty also thanked Lieutenant Herbert Brace Powell for his part in the action. Later reports do state that the privateer was the Marsouin. Unfortunately, there is no readily accessible record of what transpired, and what Lieutenant Powell's role was. Still, in 1847 the Admiralty authorized the issue of the Naval General Service Medal with clasp "Louisa 28 Octr. 1807" to all surviving claimants from the action, of which there was one.

Shortly thereafter, on 24 January 1808, the frigate Iris captured the French privateer lugger Marsouin. of 14 guns and 60 men; she had thrown her guns and anchors overboard during the chase. Captain John Tower, of Iris, reported that an examination of her logs and muster list revealed that on her last cruise on 28 October, near Cork, she had attempted to board a transport. The concealed troops fired a small arms volley that killed Marsouin's captain and ten men, and wounded five others.

In 1808 Louisa was on the Irish station and under the command of Lieutenant John Page.

== Citations and references ==
Citations

References

- Marshall, John (1832). "Hoy, Joseph" . Royal Naval Biography. Vol. 3, part 2. London: Longman and company. p. 365.
- Marshall, John (1830). "Powell, Herbert Brace" . Royal Naval Biography. Vol. sup, part 4. London: Longman and company. p. 430–431.
- Winfield, Rif (2008). British Warships in the Age of Sail 1793–1817: Design, Construction, Careers and Fates. Seaforth. ISBN 1-86176-246-1.
