= Louisville Township =

Louisville Township may refer to:

- Louisville Township, Clay County, Illinois
- Louisville Township, Pottawatomie County, Kansas, in Pottawatomie County, Kansas
- Louisville Township, Red Lake County, Minnesota
- Louisville Township, Scott County, Minnesota
