= SS Königin Luise =

A number of ships have been named SS Königin Luise:

- SS Königin Luise (1896) was a Barbarossa-class ocean liner launched in 1896 for North German Lloyd. She was renamed Omar in 1921, Edison in 1924 and was scrapped in 1935.
- SS Königin Luise (1913) was a ferry launched in 1913 for the Hamburg America Line. She was requisitioned by the Kaiserliche Marine in 1914 and became the first German naval loss of the First World War when she was sunk on 5 August 1914.
- SS Königin Luise (1934) was a ferry launched in 1934 for the Hamburg America Line. She was requisitioned by the Kriegsmarine in 1939 and was sunk by a Soviet mine in 1941.

== See also ==
- SS Queen Louise, a cargo ship launched in 1912 by the Northumberland Shipbuilding Co Ltd.
