= USS General M. L. Hersey =

Transport ship built in 1944

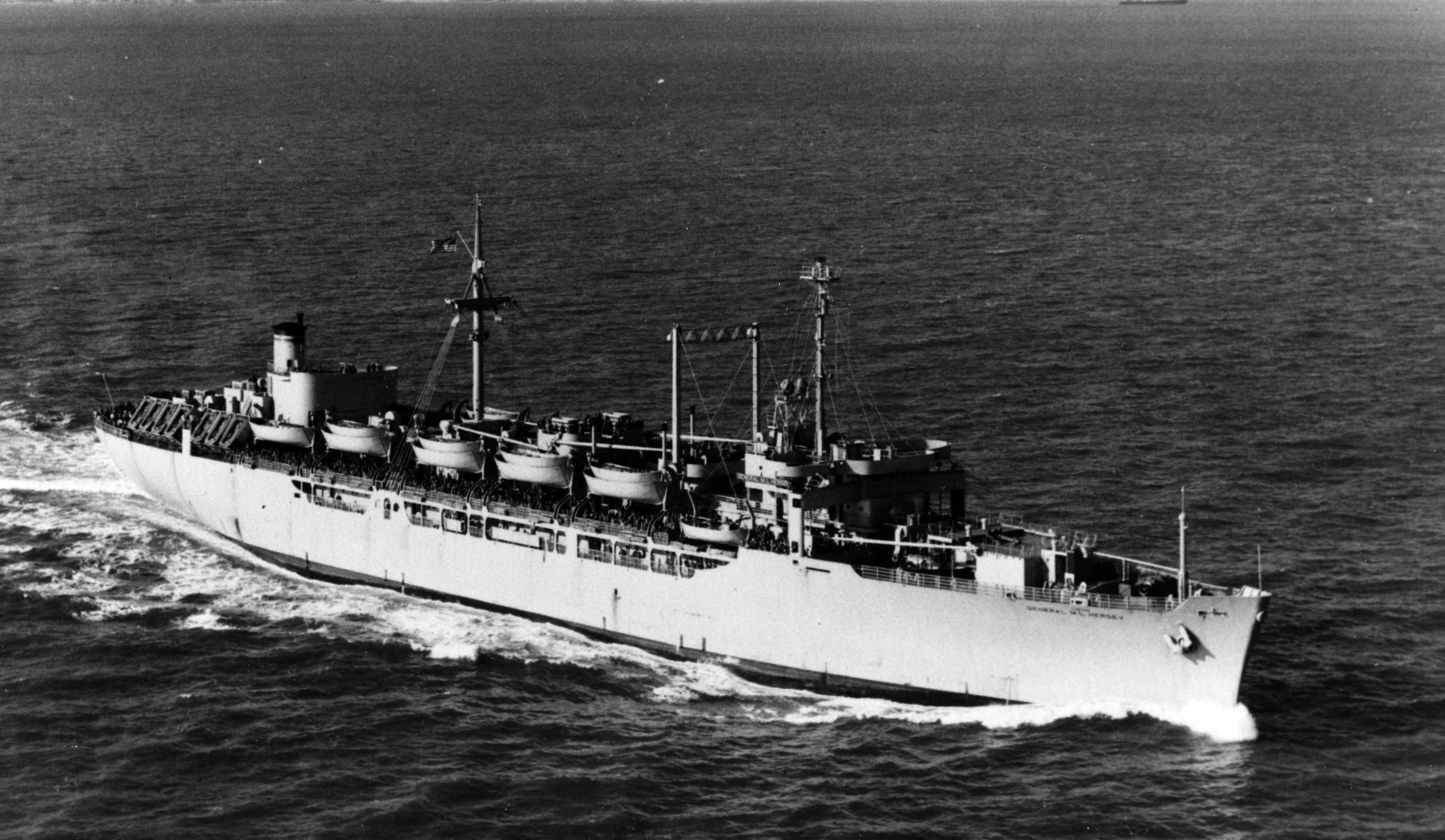
- General M. L. Hersey in 1952

History

United States
- Name: General M. L. Hersey
- Namesake: Mark Leslie Hersey
- Builder: Kaiser Co., Inc.; Richmond, California
- Laid down: Possibly before April 1944
- Launched: 1 April 1944
- Acquired: 31 May 1944
- Commissioned: 29 July 1944 (U.S. Navy)
- Decommissioned: 1 June 1946 (U.S. Navy)
- In service: 1 June 1946 (U.S. Army)
- Out of service: 1 March 1950 (U.S. Army)
- In service: 1 March 1950 (MSTS)
- Out of service: 3 September 1959 (MSTS)
- Renamed: SS Pittsburgh, 16 August 1968; SS St. Louis, September 1969
- Reclassified: T-AP-148, 1 March 1950
- Identification: IMO number: 6903228; Code letters NJIA
- Fate: Scrapped, 1988

General characteristics
- Class & type: General G. O. Squier-class transport ship later container ship
- Displacement: 9,950 tons (light), 17,250 tons (full)
- Length: 522 ft 10 in (159.36 m)
- Beam: 71 ft 6 in (21.79 m)
- Draft: 24 ft (7.32 m)
- Propulsion: steam turbine, 9,900 shp (7,400 kW) driving single screw
- Speed: 17 knots (31 km/h)
- Capacity: 3,823 troops
- Complement: 356 (officers and enlisted)
- Armament: 4 × 5"/38 caliber guns; 8 × 1.1"/75 anti-aircraft guns; 16 × 20 mm AA guns

USS General M. L. Hersey (AP-148) was a General G. O. Squier-class transport ship of the U.S. Navy in World War II. She was named in honor of U.S. Army general Mark Leslie Hersey. She was transferred to the U.S. Army as USAT General M. L. Hersey in 1946. On 1 March 1950 she was transferred to the Military Sea Transportation Service (MSTS) as USNS General M. L. Hersey (T-AP-148). She was later sold for commercial use, and operated under the names SS Pittsburgh and SS St. Louis.

== Operational history ==
General M. L. Hersey (AP-148) was built by Kaiser Co., Inc. of Richmond, California under Maritime Commission contract MC #665. She was launched on 1 April 1944 sponsored by Mrs. Alice Hersey Wick, General Hersey's daughter and acquired by the Navy on 31 May 1944. She was commissioned on 29 July 1944.

After shakedown off San Pedro, General M. L. Hersey sailed from San Francisco in September with troops and cargo for garrisons in the Southwest Pacific. She reached Milne Bay, New Guinea on 21 September and subsequently carried troops and supplies to the Admiralty Islands, the Russell Islands, and the Solomon Islands, before departing Guadalcanal on 6 October for the United States. She brought home more than 3,000 veterans of the Pacific fighting, arriving in San Francisco on 19 October. Between 7 November 1944 and 14 August 1945 the transport made four round-trip voyages from San Francisco and, Seattle to the Western Pacific, carrying troops to New Guinea, the Philippines, the Palaus, and the Marianas during the final amphibious offensive against Japan, At Leyte in November General M. L. Hersey endured frequent air attacks.

Following the surrender of Japan, she left Seattle 31 August and, steaming via the Philippines, she arrived in Yokohama on 24 September with occupation troops. There she embarked 3,052 troops and departed 5 days later as part of Operation Magic Carpet the sea-lift to return hundreds of thousands of American fighting men to the United States as quickly as possible. Between 3 December and 3 March 1946 she steamed twice to the Far East where she embarked returning veterans at Yokohama and Manila and transported them to San Pedro and San Francisco. Departing San Francisco on 23 March, she then steamed via Manila and Singapore to Calcutta, India, and Colombo, Ceylon, where she embarked "Magic Carpet" troops. She departed Colombo 28 April, sailed via the Suez Canal, and arrived in New York on 21 May. She decommissioned at New York 1 June and was turned over to War Shipping Administration (WSA) on 6 June for eventual use as a transport by the Army Transportation Service.

Rebuilt by the Army to 12,545 tons, she was on duty for the International Refugee Organization (IRO) and initially based out of New Orleans (but later based out of New York).

On 14 January 1947, during a return voyage from Bremerhaven, USAT General M. L. Hersey responded to distress calls issued by SS Tecumseh Park which was thought to be in danger of foundering 840 miles (1,350 km) off Halifax, Nova Scotia. General M. L. Hersey stood by for two days before Tecumseh Park got underway on her own.

On 16 November 1949 USAT General M. L. Hersey left Naples with 1,283 displaced persons from Europe and arrived in Melbourne, Australia on 6 December 1949. This voyage was one of almost 150 "Fifth Fleet" voyages by some 40 ships bringing refugees of World War II to Australia. General M. L. Hersey made two more such trips, arriving in Melbourne with 1,336 refugees on 27 April 1950, and in Fremantle with 1,370 passengers on 2 November 1950.

In the midst of her "Fifth Fleet" voyages to Australia, the transport was reacquired by the Navy 1 March 1950. General M. L. Hersey was placed in service and assigned to MSTS under a civilian crew. Continuing to operate out of New York, she resumed carrying European refugees to the United States in support of the IRO.

On 07:32 on 4 November 1951, while ferrying elements of the 43rd Infantry Division to Bremerhaven, USNS General M. L. Hersey struck Argentine cruise ship MS Maipo amidships in thick fog over a calm North Sea. Maipo sank some three hours after the collision off Wangerooge. All 238 people aboard Maipo were rescued, and no one aboard General M. L. Hersey was injured.

During 1952 and 1953 she made four round-trips from San Francisco to the Far East in support of the Korean War. She was placed out of service 11 June 1954 and placed in the Pacific Reserve Fleet at San Diego. Later transferred to the Maritime Administration, on 3 September 1959 she entered the National Defense Reserve Fleet, Suisun Bay, California.

The ship was sold under the MARAD Ship Exchange Program to Sea-Land Service, Inc. on 16 August 1968 and renamed SS Pittsburgh. She was renamed SS St. Louis, USCG ON 515620, IMO 6903228, in September 1969, and converted by Todd Shipbuilding, San Pedro, CA to a container ship 10 January 1970. The ship was scrapped in 1988.

General M. L. Hersey received one battle star for World War II service and two battle stars for Korean War service.

== Sources ==
- Cudahy, Brian J. (2006). Box Boats: How Container Ships Changed the World. Fordham University Press. ISBN 978-0-8232-2569-9.
- Williams, Greg H. (2013). World War II U.S. Navy Vessels in Private Hands. McFarland Books. ISBN 978-0-7864-6645-0.
