= USS Louisville (SSN-724) =

Los Angeles-class nuclear-powered attack submarine of the US Navy

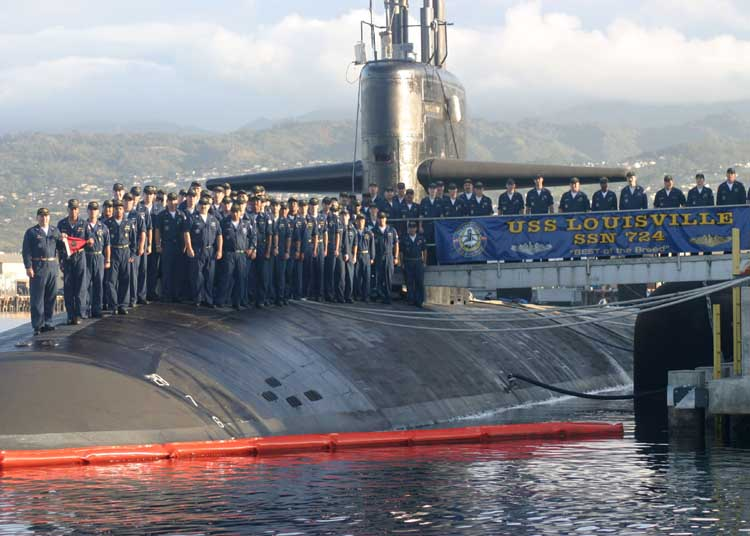
- The crew of USS Louisville

History

United States
- Name: Louisville
- Namesake: The City of Louisville, Kentucky
- Awarded: 11 February 1982
- Builder: General Dynamics Electric Boat
- Laid down: 24 September 1984
- Launched: 14 December 1985
- Commissioned: 8 November 1986
- Decommissioned: 9 March 2021
- Out of service: 6 August 2020
- Stricken: 9 March 2021
- Home port: Naval Station Bremerton
- Motto: Best of the Breed
- Status: Stricken, to be disposed of by submarine recycling
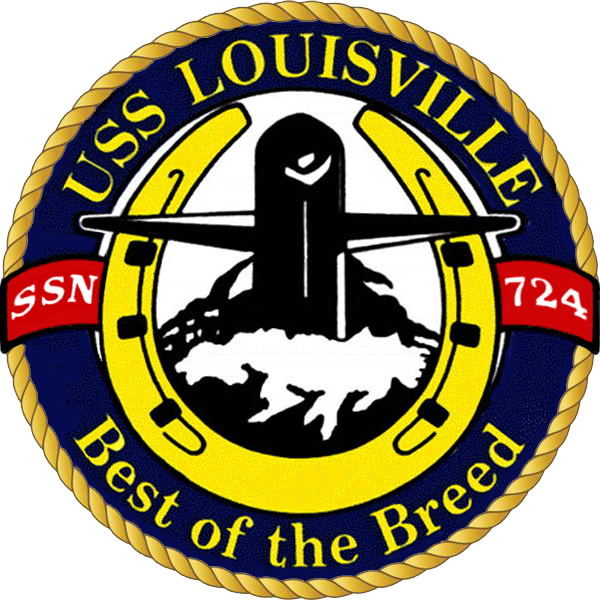
- Badge

General characteristics
- Class & type: Los Angeles-class submarine
- Displacement: 5,789 long tons (5,882 t) light; 6,185 long tons (6,284 t) full; 396 long tons (402 t) dead
- Length: 110.3 m (361 ft 11 in)
- Beam: 10 m (32 ft 10 in)
- Draft: 9.4 m (30 ft 10 in)
- Propulsion: 1 × S6G PWR nuclear reactor with D2W core (165 MW), HEU 93.5%; 2 × steam turbines (33,500) shp; 1 × shaft; 1 × secondary propulsion motor 325 hp (242 kW)
- Speed: Surfaced: 20 knots (23 mph; 37 km/h); Submerged: +20 knots (23 mph; 37 km/h) (official)
- Complement: 12 officers, 150 enlisted
- Sensors & processing systems: BQQ-5 passive sonar, BQS-15 detecting and ranging sonar, WLR-8 fire control radar receiver, WLR-9 acoustic receiver for detection of active search sonar and acoustic homing torpedoes, BRD-7 radio direction finder
- Armament: 4 × 21 in (533 mm) bow tubes, 10 Mk48 ADCAP torpedo reloads, Tomahawk land attack missile block 3 SLCM range 1,700 nautical miles (3,100 km), Harpoon anti–surface ship missile range 70 nautical miles (130 km), minelaying Mk 67 mobile Mk 60 captor mines

USS Louisville (SSN-724), a Los Angeles-class submarine, is the fourth ship of the United States Navy to be named for Louisville, Kentucky. The contract to build her was awarded to the Electric Boat Division of General Dynamics Corporation in Groton, Connecticut, on 11 February 1982 and her keel was laid on 24 September 1984. She was launched on 14 December 1985—sponsored by Mrs. Betty Ann McKee (née Harris), wife of Admiral Kinnaird McKee, Director of Naval Nuclear Propulsion —and commissioned on 8 November 1986 with Captain Charles E. Ellis in command.

Louisville serves as a trial platform for the prototype BQQ-10 ARCI sonars, which incorporate off-the-shelf computer components, allowing easy introduction of modular upgrades.

== Service history ==
Louisville transited the Panama Canal in January 1987 to make her home base at Naval Base Point Loma in San Diego as a part of Submarine Squadron 11.

During her stay at San Diego, Louisville conducted several WestPac deployments. During her 1988–1989 Westpac deployment, Louisville visited Korea, Japan, Thailand, the Philippines, and Guam.

In January and February 1991, as Operation Desert Storm began, Louisville carried out the first war patrol conducted by an American submarine since World War II. The patrol began with a 14,000-mile submerged, high-speed transit across the Pacific Ocean and Indian Ocean to the Red Sea. Shortly after noon on 19 January, she launched Tomahawk cruise missiles against targets in Iraq, becoming the first submarine to launch Tomahawks in combat. For this war patrol, Louisville was awarded the Navy Unit Commendation.

In 2003, Louisville participated in Operation Iraqi Freedom, launching 16 Tomahawk missiles from the Red Sea against targets in Iraq. Her deployment was extended to eight and a half months in support of the campaign. She was awarded the Navy Unit Commendation for her role in the operation.

Louisville completed an extensive overhaul in Portsmouth, NH, at the end of 2008. She returned to her homeport of Pearl Harbor in the spring of 2009 as a part of CSS-3.

Louisville received Meritorious Unit Commendations for both her 2014-15 and 2016-17 Western Pacific deployments. In 2017, she completed a surge U.S. Southern Command deployment to participate in the commemoration of the 100th anniversary of Chile's submarine force. In so doing, she made history as the first nuclear-powered warship to call at Talcahuano, Chile.

Following a final U.S. Central Command deployment from 2018 to 2019, Louisville changed homeport in October 2019 to Bremerton, Washington for decommissioning. She was placed out of service on 6 August 2020, and scheduled for formal decommissioning on 9 March 2021. Like all other recent U.S. submarines, the vessel will be recycled via the Navy's Ship-Submarine Recycling Program.

Louisville was decommissioned on 9 March 2021 at the Puget Sound Naval Shipyard & Intermediate Maintenance Facility.
