= Cuno (Disco Elysium) =

Video game character

Kuuno de Ruyter
- Cuno's in-game portrait
- First appearance: Disco Elysium; October 15, 2019
- Created by: Argo Tuulik
- Voiced by: Dot Major; Oliver Dabiri

In-universe information
- Origin: Revachol

Kuuno de Ruyter, known more commonly as Cuno, is a character in the 2019 video game Disco Elysium. He is a foul-mouthed boy living in Martinaise, a district of the city Revachol. He abuses substances such as amphetamines, and is accompanied by a similarly troubled girl named Cunoesse. During the investigation of the identity of a hanging corpse by the protagonist Harry Du Bois and his partner Kim Kitsuragi, Cuno antagonizes them, calling them slurs and throwing rocks at said corpse, with the player given the option to punch him and earn his respect.

Cuno is voiced by Dot Major in the original release, and by Oliver Dabiri in Disco Elysium: The Final Cut (2021). He was originally going to star alongside Cunoesse in his own video game that was cancelled in 2025. He was written by Argo Tuulik, who invented the character concept in 2005 after the idea of encountering an ugly child in the middle of nowhere who has no regard or respect for adults.

Cuno has received generally positive reception, with multiple critics discussing the scene where Harry punches Cuno and how this scene reveals a lot about Cuno's philosophy and upbringing. Critics also discussed how his behavior was affected by the world around him, particularly his bad family life and neighborhood.

== Appearances ==
Cuno originally appears in Disco Elysium, found with a girl named Cunoesse by protagonist Harry Du Bois and his partner Kim Kitsuragi throwing rocks at a hanging corpse they were sent to investigate. A resident of Martinaise, a district of Revachol, Cuno holds a great deal of disrespect for them, calling them slurs and talking himself up. When Harry speaks to him, he refuses to give any information on the victim. The only way to convince Cuno to speak is to either show him respect or punch him in the face. As Cuno begins to work with them, Cunoesse eggs him on, requiring the player to attempt separating them to be able to have an unobstructed conversation. The player can discover more details about Cuno's life, including that he abuses amphetamines and that he has an abusive drug-addicted father. Various apparel from the corpse had been stolen from the corpse, one of which being in Cuno's possession. The player is able to purchase them, and can get a discount if the player successfully showed Cuno empathy. Later in the story, if Harry is unable to prevent Kim from being shot during a standoff, Cuno will volunteer to be Harry's partner. Talking to Cuno will reveal that he split up from Cunoesse due to how unhealthy their relationship was. After solving the murder with Cuno, the player can convince another officer to let Cuno become a recruit detective, bringing him with them back to the precinct. Otherwise, Cuno will be left behind.

Cuno was intended to be the protagonist of a game called Locust City – An Elysium Story, centered around Cuno and Cunoesse. The game would have allowed the player to control either child, each of them with their own skill trees and "Thought Cabinets", a collection of ideas that they can discover from speaking to others, including each other. The two characters would have had a shared inventory and been able to combine their respective skills. The premise of the story was that Cuno had a box of locusts, which would serve as an evolving allegory for Cuno's emotions and values, as well as serving as a city-building game. 4–5 endings were planned. Different objects would have different effects for the two; while Cuno would gain points in "Encyclopedia" from wearing a hat, Cunoesse wearing the same hat would increase her "Authority". The game was cancelled in February 2025.

== Concept and creation ==
Cuno is an abrasive, arrogant teenager who enjoys calling people homophobic slurs that developer ZA/UM opted to censor. They ensured that the player, if they take offense to Cuno's speech, could attempt to have Harry take him aside and talk to him about it. Cuno often speaks in the third-person, saying things such as "fuck does Cuno care?" He was written by the game's writer, Argo Tuulik. Tuulik based Cuno's facial features and arrogance in part on the character Myron from Fallout 2. The original concept for Cuno was initially conceived in 2005 as a kid that one might find in the middle of nowhere, with misshapen teeth that might evoke the image of "countryside incest", showing unexpected arrogance for a kid speaking to an adult. He also discussed his experience as a child, growing up seeing other kids in Estonia sniffing glue, who also served as the basis for Cuno. Cuno was originally voiced by Dot Major in Disco Elysium. In Disco Elysium: The Final Cut, he was replaced by Dabiri.

== Reception ==
TheGamer writer Stacey Henley found him to be a "slimy, irritating, and generally rotten" person, and that him being so horrible made him a great character. She believed that the encounter where Harry punches Cuno in the face represented the best of Disco Elysium. She found the idea of punching him satisfying after all the invective he threw at Harry and Kim, but she stated that the fact that hitting him earned his respect and allowed the player to discover that his father beats him makes the player "feel like shit". Polygon writer Cass Marshall felt that Cuno was a "one-note joke" initially, calling him "aggressively shitty" and stating that he could not resist punching him despite viewing it as a low moment for Harry to do that. Later on, Cuno experiencing redemption as Harry's sidekick helped Disco Elysium "really click" for him. He stated that, for all the flaws the cast has, the game still has empathy for them, and that the impact of the game's ending would be dulled if characters like Cuno never changed. Rock Paper Shotgun writer Matt Cox stated that engaging with Cuno was an "unwinnable contest" due to Cuno's worldview of dominance as the only thing that matters, feeling that the lack of a clean way to "deal with Cuno" was an intentional writing choice. He believed that his maladjusted behaviors, such as drug use, comes from the circumstances he is living in, such as living in a bad neighborhood, having no mother, and having a drug-addicted father. Vice contributor Austin Walker felt that Cuno was emblematic of the kind of story that Disco Elysium was telling, which fellow contributor Cameron Kunzelman agreed with, stating that Cuno and Cunoesse's behavior serves as a demonstration of how terrible a place their city is to live in.

Vic Castro and Nicholas Kiersey, authors of The World Politics of Disco Elysium, stated that Cuno's behavior, such as spewing profanity, seemed like they were there to encourage the player to punch him. They stated that, as the player progresses, they may find information that helps inform why Cuno is the way he is, making it easier for players to speak to him. They also discussed how Cuno served as a mirror for the deserter; where they argue that the deserter is plagued by an excess of remembrance and guilt, they state that Cuno instead exemplifies the ability to forgive and move on, citing dialogue where Cuno states "Cuno forgives and moves on". They questioned whether this was the case and whether he exemplifies Friedrich Nietzsche's Übermensch, arguing that Cuno has a tendency to exaggerate things about himself in such a way that he may deceive even himself.

Rock Paper Shotgun writer Alec Meer found Cuno to be a particularly intimidating character, stating that he was more frightening than any other character he'd encountered in fiction. He felt that while he was a child, the fact that he was a child lent him a "total absence of shame, or fear, or regret". He felt that this made Cuno, despite his lack of intelligence, able to always have a comeback to anything Harry said, thereby lacking any of the "anxieties interwoven into social communication that interrupt our instinctive comments". He felt that his common opening line, "fuck does Cuno care?", was a "masterclass in violent narcissism" and reflected a type of person he sometimes encountered in real life who have no regard for others and may even take joy in their suffering. Vice writer Colin Spacetwinks felt that Cuno, alongside Harry and Kim, was the most important character to understanding how the game "bobs and weaves its way around sincerity, politics, and the connection between the two". He felt that Cuno was the least connected to politics in the game, stating that a drug-addicted child throwing rocks at corpses and slurs at cops was not the kind of person who would be debating the pros and cons of different political ideas. He also contrasted Kim with Cuno, stating that both characters take a lot of effort to coax into saying how they really feel. He felt that Cuno's aggression towards Harry and Kim represented a desire to avoid being seen as soft, arguing that where Kim is consciously shielding himself, Cuno may be unconsciously doing so.

Polygon writer Holly Boson stated that Cuno in the 2019 release was made into a "fan favorite" due to Dot Major's "stereotypical Scouse" accent. Despite this, she enjoyed Oliver Dabiri's turn at Cuno, stating that he helps exemplify Cuno's "thoughtful and artistic side" in the later parts of Cuno's story. Rock Paper Shotgun writer Nic Reuben expressed disappointment with some recasting choices in The Final Cut, noting Cuno's as a particularly disappointing one despite thinking Dabiri's performance was good. He described the new voice as "much less colourful". Cuno was listed as one of IGN's favorite video game characters of 2019, with writer Jeremy Azevado stating that he was his favorite non-playable character due to his "rude and willfully ignorant demeanor".
