= Kim Kitsuragi =

Video game character

- Kitsuragi's in-game portrait
- First appearance: Disco Elysium; October 15, 2019
- Created by: ZA/UM
- Voiced by: Jullian Champenois

In-universe information
- Title: Lieutenant
- Occupation: Police detective
- Origin: Revachol

Kim Kitsuragi is a character in the 2019 detective video game Disco Elysium. As a non-playable companion character, he assists the player character in solving a murder that comprises the game's main plot. Kitsuragi is defined by his Asian-inspired background, private queerness, and calm, stoic personality. He was noted by journalists and academics for his reactions to the player's choices, ranging from deadpan quips to moments of approval and vulnerability.

Kitsuragi was designed by the Estonian studio ZA/UM under the direction of Robert Kurvitz. The writer had previously developed the fictional setting for a novel and tabletop role-playing sessions. The team wanted to innovate on typical dialog trees seen in role-playing video games, deciding to only reveal aspects of Kitsuragi's character in specific situations. They decided that the character should have a "vaguely French" accent, leading them to cast the actor Jullian Champenois for his voice performance.

Kim Kitsuragi received acclaim as a standout character from Disco Elysium. Critics highlighted his subtle responses, moral integrity, and endearing presence, describing how his interactions contributed to the game's most memorable moments. Kitsuragi was celebrated as one of the best video game characters of 2019, with journalists noting his exceptional writing, design, and performance. His portrayal is recognized for reflecting Disco Elysium's themes and offering a nuanced representation of queer and cultural experiences.

== Appearances ==
Local law enforcement solving one little homicide decides nothing... Not solving it... can have real and calculable effects. Things can always get worse.

— Kim Kitsuragi in Disco Elysium, Day One

Kim Kitsuragi first appeared in the 2019 detective video game Disco Elysium, with additional voiced dialog featured in the game's 2021 remastered edition, Disco Elysium: The Final Cut. Throughout the game, Kitsuragi serves as the non-playable partner to the player character protagonist, Harrier "Harry" Du Bois.

The story of Disco Elysium centers on an unsolved murder in Martinaise, a neglected district between two police precincts in the fictional city of Revachol. When each precinct sends a detective to investigate, Lieutenant Kitsuragi is assigned to partner with Du Bois. Kitsuragi is depicted with an orange bomber jacket, as well as a visible heritage from Seol, a fictional culture inspired by Korea and Japan. As Du Bois struggles with a hangover and memory loss, Kitsuragi guides him to the murder victim to conduct an autopsy, becoming a source of competence and advice. For most of the story, Kitsuragi remains aloof, calm, and stoic. On occasion, he expresses approval when the player forms intelligent theories about the murder case. He may respond with deadpan remarks when the player makes mistakes.

Aspects of Kitsuragi's character are incrementally revealed through numerous optional interactions with the player character. While he can grow annoyed with the player's antics, he sometimes cooperates with the player's more eccentric behaviors and may even show moments of vulnerability. If the player asks Kitsuragi about his sexuality, he confirms that he is gay with a witty remark. In another moment, Kitsuragi makes a small error and the player can decide how to react. When faced with racism directed at Kitsuragi, the player can decide whether to intervene, prompting complex reactions from Kitsuragi. The game features many small interactions with Kitsuragi, such as sharing a stolen sandwich, having a dance-off, or simply nodding at each other. At the climax of the game, Kitsuragi accompanies Du Bois to arrest the murderer. In one of the game's endings, the player can invite Kitsuragi to switch precincts and join Du Bois. However, the player can also lose Kitsuragi's trust or cause him to be shot and hospitalized.

The game's developers highlighted Kitsuragi in appearances outside the story, including the marketing and merchandise for his signature jacket in 2022, as well as a free "Collage Mode" released in 2023, wherein the player can arrange the game's characters into custom scenes.

== Concept and creation ==
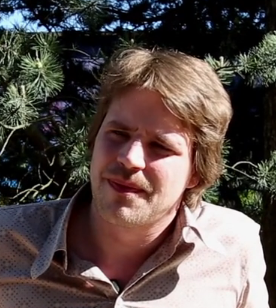
Robert Kurvitz was the lead designer and writer for Disco Elysium, as well as one of the founders of ZA/UM.

Kim Kitsuragi was created by the Estonian game studio ZA/UM for Disco Elysium. Most of the team had never made a video game. Robert Kurvitz, ZA/UM's founder and the game's lead designer and writer, leaned into the Elysium setting he had first explored in his novel Sacred and Terrible Air, as well as a homebrew tabletop role-playing game based in the same setting. The team tried to avoid the role-playing video game convention of exploring every option in a dialogue tree, instead designing Kitsuragi to share personal details only in specific situations. Kurvitz tried to expand the game's choices and consequences through small moments of reactivity, "where your coworkers remember every embarrassing thing you said last night when you were drunk". The team decided that Kitsuragi should find the player character amusing and sometimes indulge him against his better judgment. Kurvitz commented that Kitsuragi's willingness to occasionally go against his instincts "gives him a warmth that's so endearing".

In contrast to the player character, the writers discussed Kitsuragi's potential attributes and beliefs. While these were not implemented in the game, Kurvitz assumed that Kitsuragi would score high in volition, making him resistant to personal questions. Although Kitsuragi was written as attracted to the same gender, his relationship with Du Bois remains platonic. When asked why the player cannot kiss Kitsuragi, the writer Justin Keenan argued that "the thing about desire is that it's stronger when it's not totally satisfied". Kurvitz saw Kitsuragi as a "systemic metaphor" for the game: "What he does for the officer is what Disco Elysium tries its darndest to do for the player. Let's get through this shit, it says. It's not fair, or easy, but it's not entirely impossible either ... And hey, it's not much, but you have me."

When selecting an actor to voice the character, ZA/UM decided that a "vaguely French" accent would fit Revachol. After a four-year search, they discovered the actor Jullian Champenois through a voice-over agency, selecting him for his French accent and emotional tone. Kurvitz felt that the actor embodied their intentions for the character, especially "the cool, the deadpan, and the warmth". During recording sessions, ZA/UM helped Champenois visualize and understand each scene, spending more time on the first day to find what worked. When the expanded Final Cut added voiced dialog to previously unspoken lines, Champenois became one of the few original voice actors who was not recast.

== Analysis ==
Academics have studied the importance of Kitsuragi's reactions to the player. In Games and Narrative: Theory and Practice, Leanne Taylor-Giles highlighted Kitsuragi's reactions during the autopsy sequence for reinforcing his character while giving useful feedback to the player. A qualitative study by Piotr Klimczyk found that many players felt strongly about earning Kitsuragi's approval, noting feelings of personal growth and post-game melancholy. At the 2023 Digital Games Research Association conference, Jon Stone suggested that Kitsuragi's approval served as a moral anchor for the player, granting them agency to humorously test the game's boundaries with benign violations. In a paper published in Frontiers in Virtual Reality, Lena Fanya Aeschbach and her co-authors described how bothering Kitsuragi achieves a distancing effect between the player and the protagonist, offering an alternative to player characters designed for immersion. An essay by Evan D. Bernick of the Northern Illinois University College of Law cited Kitsuragi's reactions as a moral compass in a failing legal system. In Trauma im Computerspiel, Thomas Spies similarly noted Kitsuragi's role as a moral authority and voice of reason.

Kitsuragi is often highlighted as an example of how Disco Elysium approaches its themes and ideological viewpoints. Colin Spacetwinks of Waypoint compared the concealed emotions of the game's characters to the guarded political views of the game's authors, making Kitsuragi feel unexpectedly genuine when he says "I'd rather not talk about it" when asked difficult questions. In Video Games, Crime, and Control, Edward L. W. Green remarked how Kitsuragi's stoicism mirrors other hardboiled detective fiction, which focuses more on personal ethics than ideology or justice.

Writing for NME, Georgina Young highlighted Kitsuragi as an example of the game's intelligent approach to social and cultural issues, with his fictional Seol heritage particularly relevant to real life. In Critical Theories in Dark Tourism, Florence Smith Nicholls pointed out how one character's racist assumptions leads them to treat Kitsuragi as a tourist, evoking an ironic contrast between Kitsuragi's knowledge of the city and the protagonist's amnesia. Fraser Brown of PC Gamer noted a moment where the player can attempt to challenge racism directed at Kitsuragi, describing how after "a seemingly throwaway conversation, I reconsidered the relationship between Kim and his forgetful partner, and it grounded me in the world".

== Reception ==
Kim Kitsuragi has been frequently praised as an essential part of Disco Elysium and its critical acclaim. Lauren Morton of PC Gamer hailed Kitsuragi as the game's "breakout star", describing how "an empathetic enough detective can manage to uncover brief moments of vulnerability" in the otherwise unflappable character. GamePro's David Molke called Kitsuragi one of his favorite game heroes, highlighting his subtle reactions against the player's antics, while still showing loyalty and patience. Diego Arguello of Inverse also praised Kitsuragi for offering a compelling contrast with the protagonist, "building an unbreakable bond of kindness that persists throughout the story". Andy Kelly of PC Gamer praised the character's writing and voice performance, offering a "voice of reason" portrayed with "reassuring warmth and an endearing, deadpan cool". Cameron Kunzelman of Vice described Kitsuragi's dual role in the protagonist's professional and personal life, explaining that he was "written in such a way that I came to feel that I really knew him and why he cared about all of this in the end". Commentators frequently mentioned the character's popularity and appeal, with Sam Chandler of Shacknews declaring that "you will either want to marry Kim Kitsuragi or drown your sorrows in tequila". Madeline Carpou from The Mary Sue felt that Kitsuragi was a significant factor in making Disco Elysium one of the best-written games ever made.

Kitsuragi's reactions to the player's choices have been celebrated as highlights from the game. Joe DeVader from Nintendo World Report noted purposely annoying Kitsuragi as some of the game's best interactions. PC Gamer's Jody Macgregor highlighted the autopsy sequence, explaining how Kitsuragi's approval was "delicious", likening it to an addictive drug. Eric Van Allen of Destructoid praised the moments of "small kindness" shared between Kitsuragi and Du Bois, when the player can allow Kitsuragi to correct a minor error without embarrassment. George Foster from RPG Site highlighted Kitsuragi's role in several of his game's favorite moments. Noting his complex behavior during a racist interaction in the game, Madeline Carpou described Kitsuragi as "one of the best representations of an Asian immigrant story I've seen in a video game" and an element of the character's overall popularity. Writing for TheGamer, Gab Hernandez discussed a small interaction where Kitsuragi reveals his sexuality to the player character in a "nonchalant" and "mundane" way, making him "one of the most iconic gay characters in video games".

A promotional booth at EGX London 2022 featured a portrait of Kitsuragi, which fans transformed into a tribute decorated with fan mail and fan art of the character. When ZA/UM released the Kitsuragi-themed bomber jacket, it was praised by Renata Price of Kotaku and Noelle Warner of Destructoid. Fans were more critical of the "Collage Mode", with some suggesting that it allowed fans to contradict Kitsuragi's character, while others accused ZA/UM of exploiting his popularity to distract from the studio's ongoing litigation against the game's creators.

=== Accolades ===
Kitsuragi was nominated as one of the best video game characters of 2019 by Adventure Gamers and Fanbyte. Lillian King of The Blade also praised him as their favorite game character of the year, feeling that he was "[e]xceptionally well-written ... bolstered by a myriad of fleeting interactions that let players see into the detective's inner life, rounding out his complexity with the little contradictions that make us all truly, chaotically, human". When ranking characters from video games overall, Rowan Cardosa of TheGamer declared Kitsuragi to be one of gaming's best voiced characters, with fellow TheGamer writer Jaclyn Blute hailing him as one of gaming's best gay characters. Polygon included him in their 2024 Video Game Companion Hall of Fame, with Cass Marshall describing him as "the perfect straight man for Disco Elysium's disaster protagonist". He has also been proclaimed as one of the best companions in video games by both Comic Book Resources and Shacknews, with further acclaim from Edwin Evans-Thirlwell of Eurogamer calling him "perhaps the finest companion character in a game". Ted Litchfield at PC Gamer ranked Kitsuragi's platonic relationship to the player character as one of gaming's best romances, particularly because "you have to earn Kim's trust" and "it's something you can waste away, mak[ing] his approval all the more meaningful". The ZA/UM team was surprised by Kitsuragi's popularity and acclaim, with Kurvitz stating that they "felt he's a real person and our friend".
