= Andres Allan =

Estonian poet

Andres-Allan Ellmann (born Andres-Allan Kurvits, better known by his pseudonym Andres Allan; 24 September 1965 – 22 July 1988) was an Estonian poet.

== Life ==
Andres Allan was born in Tallinn. He was the younger brother of artist Raoul Kurvits. He attended primary school at Tallinn Secondary School No. 7 (now, Tallinn English College) and secondary school at Tallinn Secondary School No. 2 (now, Tallinn Secondary School of Science), graduating in 1983. After secondary school, he studied at the Institute of Theology of the Estonian Evangelical Lutheran Church.

Andres Allan wrote poetry with a mystical-religious connotation. His poems have been published in the newspaper Edasi and in the magazines Vikerkaar, Kultuur ja Elu, Looming, Marm, and Noorus.

He died after a fall from balcony in Tallinn in 1988, aged 22. It is uncertain whether the fall was a suicide or an accident. He was buried in Pärnamäe Cemetery in Tallinn.

== Books ==
=== Poetry ===
- Urjamised (1992)
- Öötrükid, edited by Lauri Sommer (2009)

== Family ==
Video game designer and novelist Robert Kurvitz is his nephew.
