= List of Chinese-English translators =

This is a list of Chinese-English translators. Lists and biographies of translators of contemporary literature (fiction, essays, poetry) are maintained by Paper Republic, Modern Chinese Literature and Culture (MCLC), and on the Renditions Translator database.

== A ==
- Eric Abrahamsen

== B ==
- John Balcom
- Geremie Barme
- Samuel Beal
- Charles Henry Brewitt-Taylor
- Witter Bynner

== C ==
- Yuen Ren Chao
- Chen Maiping
- Cheng Yang-ping
- Chi Pang-yuan
- Thomas Cleary
- Arthur Cooper (translator)

== D ==
- Homer H. Dubs

== F ==
- Gia-Fu Feng

== G ==
- Herbert Giles
- Lionel Giles
- Howard Goldblatt — translator of contemporary Chinese fiction
- Eleanor Goodman - translator of contemporary Chinese poetry
- Gu Hongming
- Robert van Gulik

== H ==
- Lloyd Haft
- Nicky Harman
- David Hawkes (sinologist) — translator of the Chinese classic Story of the Stone or Dream of the Red Chamber, by Cao Xueqin
- David Hinton
- Brian Holton (translator)
- Huang Ai

== I ==
- Jeremy Ingalls

== J ==
- Linda Jaivin

== K ==
- George Kao
- Gregory B. Lee
- Mabel Lee
- James Legge
- Sylvia Li-chun Lin
- Lin Wusong
- Perry Link
- Julia Lovell
- Charles Luk

== L ==
- Ken Liu
- Lin Yutang

== M ==
- John Minford
- Stephen Mitchell (translator)

== P ==
- Martin Palmer
- David Pollard
- Ezra Pound

== Q ==
- Qiu Xiaolong

== R ==
- Michael Rank
- Jo Riley
- Rudolf Ritsema
- David Tod Roy

== S ==
- Michael Saso
- Sidney Shapiro
- William Edward Soothill
- Fiona Sze-Lorrain

== T ==
- Jeremy Tiang
- Robert Thom (translator)

== U ==
- Edna W. Underwood

== V ==
- Laura Veirs

== W ==
- Arthur Waley
- Wang Chi-chen
- Helen Wang — translator of contemporary Chinese literature, especially fiction for children
- Annelise Finegan Wasmoen - winner of 2015 Best Translated Book Award
- Burton Watson
- Honey Watson
- Thomas Watters
- Timothy C. Wong

== X ==
- Xu Yuanchong

== Y ==
- Gladys Yang
- Yang Xianyi
