= Arvi Siig =

Estonian communist poet

Arvi Siig (8 November 1938 – 23 November 1999) was an Estonian poet, translator and journalist. He was a member of the CPSU and a communist, but still critical of many aspects of the political aspects of his day. His poetry inspired later punk poets and many of his texts are used as lyrics by the Estonian alternative rock band Vennaskond. He was among the first to include modern urban themes in Estonian poetry, also giving a voice to prostitutes, including Soviet prostitutes.

The creators of the award-winning computer RPG Disco Elysium, Robert Kurvitz and Aleksander Rostov hailed Siig as inspiration and the greatest Estonian poet when accepting the president's Young Cultural Figure award in 2020: "Without his modernism, Elysium - the world the game is placed in - would not be half of what it is." Also, lyrics of some of Robert Kurvitz progressive rock group Ultramelanhool are from Siig poems.

== Personal life ==
Arvi Siig married a Russian cultural journalist Valentina Siig, who published her memories about him after his death.
