= Hopetown (video game) =

Upcoming video game

- Developer: Longdue Games
- Publisher: Longdue Games
- Writers: Martin Luiga, Olga Moskvina
- Platform: Windows
- Genre: Role-playing
- Mode: Single-player

Hopetown is an upcoming role-playing video game developed and published by Longdue Games. The studio includes former members of studio ZA/UM, such as writers Martin Luiga and Olga Moskvina, or voice actor Lenval Brown, all known for taking a significant part in the development of Disco Elysium (2019). The game is often highlighted as one of the main successors of the original Disco Elysium.

== Gameplay ==
The player takes a role of a journalist in a world reset after "The Flare", a coronal mass ejection that destroyed global communications. Investigating mysteries of the town called New Greenwich, the player chooses between three different writing styles: investigative, sensationalist, and vogue, defining the background of the character and style of journalism, which includes taking photos and interviews of characters, or discovering clues, evidence and writing observations. Similar to Disco Elysium, the main character is guided by 21 different personalities that periodically talk to them, with each one representing a certain skill or aspect, required for their work.

== Development ==
Development of Hopetown is closely tied to intellectual rights controversy surrounding ZA/UM and some of its members who are responsible for the creation of Disco Elysium. The former members split into different studios and started working on their own projects, that are often referred as "spiritual successors" to Disco Elysium, despite not being set in the world of the game. Developers of Hopetown - Longdue Games - are based in London. Hopetown was announced and funded via a Kickstarter campaign in March 2025, and was often described as a "psychogeographic RPG". The official gameplay teaser was shown on May 21, 2026, the same day Zero Parades: For Dead Spies, a game made by ZA/UM, was released.
