= Summer Eternal =

Independent video game studio based in Zagreb, Croatia

- Industry: Video games
- Founded: 2024
- Founders: Argo Tuulik; Dora Klindžić; Aleksandar Gavrilović; Andrus Laansalu
- Headquarters: Zagreb, Croatia
- Website: https://summereternal.com/

Summer Eternal is a video game developer based in Zagreb, Croatia. It was co-founded in 2024 by Argo Tuulik and Dora Klindžić, former employees of the Disco Elysium developer ZA/UM, as well as Aleksandar Gavrilović, owner of independent game studio Gamechuck. As of 2026, several former ZA/UM staff members collaborate with Summer Eternal, including writer Olga Moskvina, concept artist Anastasia Ivanova, graphic designer Michael Oswell, audio designer/writer Andrus Laansalu, and programmer Jaagup Irve (credited as author.)

== History ==
Summer Eternal was first publicly revealed on 11 October 2024, and is one of several studios founded by former ZA/UM staff following the release of Disco Elysium. Its first press release included the founding members' manifesto and a breakdown of the studio's worker-run structure.

In August 2025, a video by People Make Games detailed the establishment of Summer Eternal by Tuulik and Klindžić, which is being sued by CoGrammar. CoGrammar is another studio making a "spiritual successor" to Disco Elysium, who employed Tuulik and Klindžić for a period of seven and a half weeks and is suing them over a non-compete clause in their contracts that was arguably breached when the two created their own studio.

In September 2025, the studio announced the title of its first role-playing video game, Red Rooster, with more information to be revealed in their first anthology. Summer Eternal Anthology Volume One was released worldwide on 14 October 2026. On the same day, they officially revealed Red Rooster for the first time to a public audience, labeling it an incendiary role-playing game.

== Organization ==
Summer Eternal is organized as a cooperative; creatives have a 50% stake in the company, collaborators 25%, investors 20%, and players 5%. The 5% "player owned" stake is formally held by a non-profit organization. Registered players can assist in the organization and investments of the studio, but do not receive any share in company profits.

== Releases ==
In October 2026, Summer Eternal released the book, Summer Eternal Anthology Volume One in partnership with Tabletop role-playing game publisher Peregrine Coast Press, the release showcased art and information related to the studios upcoming game, Red Rooster, as well as interviews, such as with Marxist economists Richard D. Wolff, Yanis Varoufakis, science fiction author Ted Chiang and various game developers, including former BioWare developer David Gaider. Alongside the Anthologies limited edition run was a 10-inch Vinyl record featuring music from Electronic/Industrial artists Corvad and Nemeček, with two of the tracks, 'Flux Core' and 'Pyrocene', being both written for the world of Red Rooster, the covering included artwork from digital artist Schmrgl.
