= Raoul Kurvitz =

Estonian artist (born 1961)

Raoul Kurvitz (né Kurvits; born 3 February 1961) is an Estonian artist, musician and actor.

He graduated from Estonian SSR State Art Institute (now Estonian Academy of Art) 1984 with a degree in architecture; he is best known for co-founding and leading the art collective Group T (Rühm T).

== Personal exhibitions ==
Personal exhibitions:

- 1991 Ormus I. Intermedia Centre Fylkingen, Stockholm
- 1992 Infected. Gallery Okra, Vantaa, Finland
- 1992 Myra Art Limited I. Vaal Gallery, Tallinn
- 1992 Myra Art Limited II. Tallinn Art Hall's Gallery, Tallinn
- 1992 Ormus II. Gallery Marius Project, Copenhagen
- 1993 Ormus III. Luum Gallery, Tallinn
- 1993 Sammas Gallery, Tallinn
- 1996 Topographic. Rüütli Gallery, Tartu
- 1999 He and She. (with Ene-Liis Semper), Gallery Noass, Riga
- 1999 Sümfoonia Si-bemoll. Tallinn Art Hall
- 2000 About Love. Vaal Gallery, Tallinn
- 2002 Impeerium. Rakvere Town Gallery, Estonia
- 2004 Viinistu Art Museum, Estonia
- 2006 Tädi Klaara ja teised. Vaal Gallery, Tallinn

== Personal life ==
He is the older brother of late artist Andres Allan. He is in a relationship with painter and fellow Group T founder Lilian Mosolainen; novelist and video game designer Robert Kurvitz is their son.
