= Red Rooster (video game) =

2026 simulator video game

- Arta-Tantor art from the official website
- Developer: Summer Eternal
- Publisher: Summer Eternal
- Designers: Bartosz Olszewski; Black Rooster
- Programmer: Jaagup Irve
- Writers: Argo Tuulik; Dora Klindžić
- Engine: Unreal Engine 5
- Platforms: Windows; PlayStation 5; Xbox Series; Nintendo Switch
- Genre: Role-playing
- Mode: Single-player

Red Rooster is an upcoming 3D role-playing video game, developed and published by Summer Eternal. It is known for being a spiritual alternative to Disco Elysium, with Summer Eternal having former ZA/UM employees who left the company and founded their studio in 2024. The game was first announced in September 2026, with official reveal on 14 October 2026 of the same year, with no exact release date stated. Developers have plans launching the game for PC, PlayStation 5, Xbox Series and Switch 2. The game is co-financed through the Creative Europe MEDIA Fund.

== Overview ==
Summer Eternal describe Red Rooster as "incendiary, physics-driven RPG combining the best of cerebral, worldbuilding-rich RPGs." The reveal of the game was accompanied by a 500-page physical book titled "Summer Eternal Anthology Volume One," showcasing the game's concept art, design, world building and including interviews with people like Yanis Varoufakis, Richard Wolff, David Gaider and Ted Chiang. The studio stated that the game is "nearing the end of pre-production" and that an internal tech demo already exists. Red Rooster contains several gameplay similarities to Disco Elysium, such as "The Coop" similar to the "Thought Cabinet."

The studio lists several sources of inspiration behind the gameplay, including titles such as Planescape: Torment, Vampire: The Masquerade – Bloodlines, and Arcanum: Of Steamworks and Magick Obscura, also supplemented by interractive physics based mechanics from games such as Exanima, Dark Messiah of Might and Magic, and Larian Studios' Divinity series.

== Plot ==
The game takes place in the city of Arta-Tantor, located on the "border archipelago" in a political real-world alternate-history magical realism setting. The player controls Redrick Roost - an inmate who was offered the role of an arson investigator and partnered up with a drug-dependent mathematician - Dr Astrid Albers - to investigate a mysterious fire that seems to connect to his brother, the city's fire-chief. In exchange for Redrick's help, he is promised a blanket pardon for his crimes and a guaranteed return to the society he has been absent from for over a decade.
