= Fan Wu =

Chinese-American novelist

- Chinese: 吴帆
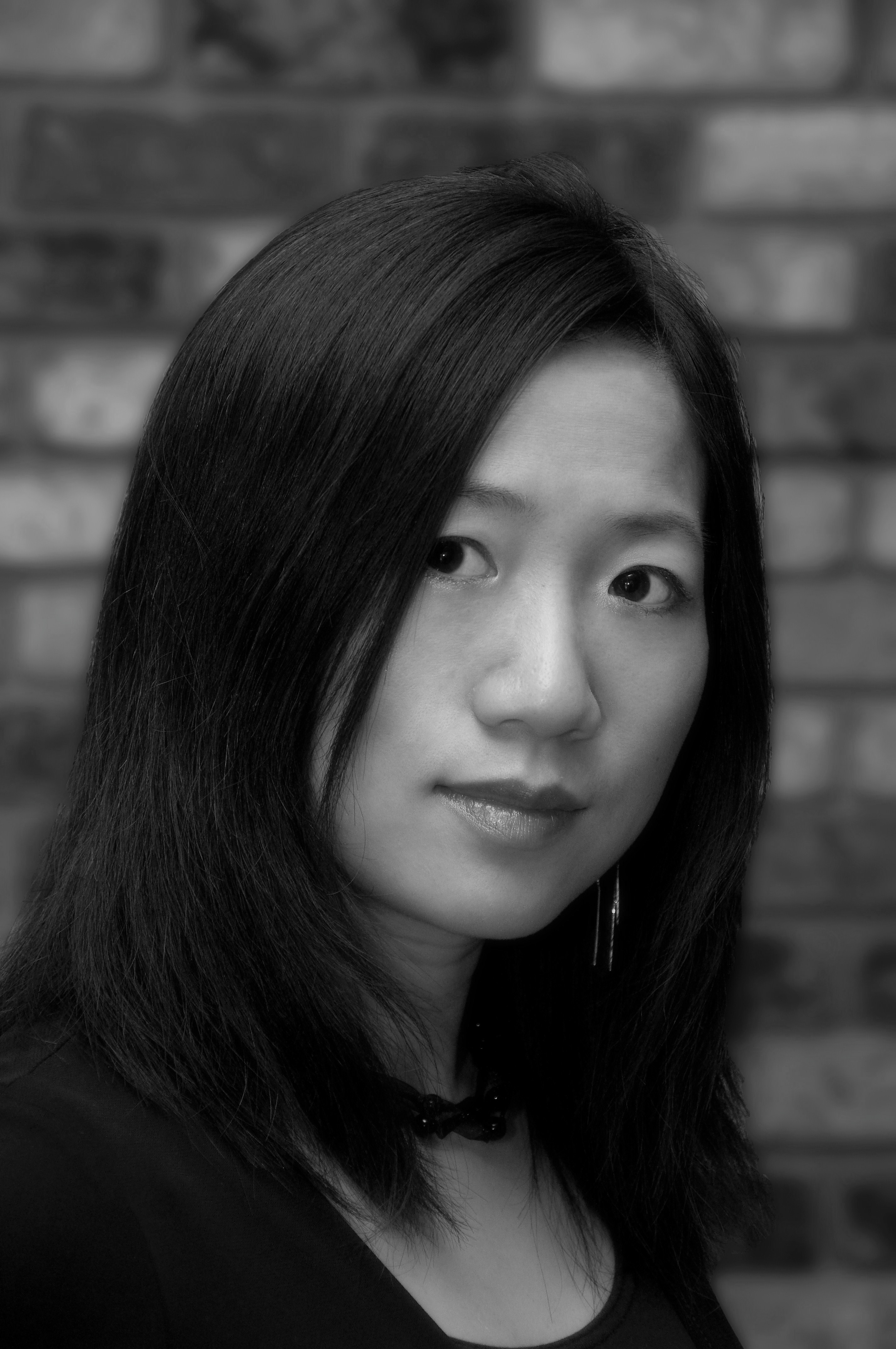
- Fan Wu (2009)
- Born: 1974 (age 51–52); Nanchang, Jiangxi Province, China
- Education: Sun Yat-sen University; Stanford University
- Writing career
- Language: English, Chinese
- Subjects: China; Chinese immigrants in the United States; multicultural issues; women's issues

Fan Wu (Chinese: 吴帆; born 1974) is a bilingual Chinese-American novelist and short story writer. She often translates her own work between English and Chinese. She has expressed her dilemma in choosing which language to use.

== Early life and education ==
Fan Wu grew up on a state-run farm in Nanchang, Jiangxi Province where her parents were exiled during the Cultural Revolution. She mentioned in her writing that "Despite poverty and isolation, the farm provided me with boundless freedom and joy." She studied Chinese Language and Literature in Sun Yat-sen University in mid-90s, where she obtained a BA. Afterwards, she went to work in Shenzhen and Guangzhou, holding varied jobs in government and private sectors for three years before traveling to the United States for graduate studies at Stanford University in late 90s. The three years of working in China has allowed her to "witness the unprecedented economic boom, as well as the exploitation of workers from poor provinces and the countryside." She received a Master's degree in Mass Media Studies from Stanford University.

== Career ==
Fan worked as a web editor and market research analyst at Yahoo! in Silicon Valley for ten years. She began to write in 2002, while working full time. She currently resides in northern California.

Fan writes about China and Chinese immigrants living in the US, with a particular focus on women's life, identity, and multicultural issues. Her writing is populated with characters who are travelers, both physically and psychologically. Her debut novel, February Flowers (Simon & Schuster), tells the story of college campus life in China. The book is her first attempt in writing creatively in English, and has been translated into eight languages. She has translated the book herself into Chinese for its publication in China.

Her second novel, Beautiful as Yesterday (Simon & Schuster), centers around two sisters who were born and brought up in China but now reside in the United States. It's praised by Amy Tan as a story "with intelligence, insight, and heart."

She also writes short stories and her writing has appeared in Granta, The Missouri Review, Asia Literary Review, Ploughshares and other leading publications. Her short story has been anthologized, translated and nominated for Pushcart Prize. She is currently working on her fourth novel and a short story collection.

Besides writing fiction, she has reviewed books for San Francisco Chronicle.

Her latest novel, The Souls Left Behind, a wartime story set in China and France, is forthcoming in both Chinese and English.

== Other ==
Fan is a trustee and a long-time volunteer at the British charity The Mothers’ Bridge of Love’ (MBL), which helps adoptive families in the west to understand China, and also builds libraries for rural children in China. In 2016, she co-organized the Southern China International Literary Festival in Guangzhou, China, along with her other work in promoting Chinese literary voices in the west.

In 2020, she co-founded Society of Heart's Delight (愉园社, Yuyuanshe), a California-based nonprofit to foster understanding and communication between Chinese immigrants and cultural and ethnic groups. She's the creator of the bilingual photoblog of "Chinese immigrants in Silicon Valley and Beyond - My Story, My Community, My Home." This photoblog showcases the variety of the Chinese community as a cultural and ethnic group and advocates for cultural sensitivity, understanding, and inclusion.

== Books ==
- February Flowers. Simon & Schuster. 2007. ISBN 978-1-4165-4943-7. has been translated into eight languages and sold in more than fifteen countries
- Beautiful as Yesterday. Simon & Schuster. 2009. ISBN 978-1-4165-9889-3.
- Souls Left Behind. Sinoist Books. 2024. ISBN 978-1-8389-0597-2. (translated by Honey Watson)
