= Honey Watson =

British author

- Born: Honey Barbara Watson
- Education: University College London; Yenching Academy (Peking University); New York University
- Occupation: Writer, Translator
- Writing career
- Years active: 2023–present
- Genres: Horror, science fiction
- Notable work: Lessons in Birdwatching (2023)

Honey Barbara Watson (born 1994) is an English author and translator of literature from Mandarin to English. Her debut science fiction novel Lessons in Birdwatching was published in 2023. She joined video game studio ZA/UM as a writer for Zero Parades: For Dead Spies.

== Early life and education ==
Watson is from Yorkshire and attended Wakefield Girls' High School. She graduated with a first in History from University College London (UCL). She then pursued the Master's programme at Yenching Academy, a graduate college of Peking University, in Beijing. She states she did not speak a word of Chinese before arriving in Beijing.

After reading the assigned reading, Lu Xun's Diary of a Madman, Watson insisted on changing majors to Chinese literature, and began the process of self-teaching herself to translate literature.

Following Yenching, Watson pursued a PhD in Comparative Literature from NYU.

== Career ==
Chinese novelist Su Tong gave a month-long series of lectures at NYU, which Watson assisted by providing English language translations of his discussed stories throughout. This would lead to Watson translating a short story collection of Tong's called Midnight Stories: A short story collection from the mind behind Raise the Red Lantern.

Her debut novel Lessons in Birdwatching was published by Angry Robot in 2023 in the US and UK to positive reviews. She would write from dive bars in Las Vegas.

Watson's first novel-length translation was Fan Wu's Souls Left Behind: A WW1 Chinese Labour Corps Novel.

She contributed to a collection of short stories by Yao Emei, where each story was translated by a different translator, called The Unfilial: Four Tragic Tales from Modern China.

== Bibliography ==
=== Novels ===
- Lessons in Birdwatching - (Angry Robot, 2023).
- The Emperor's Twin - (Skyhorse Publishing, 2025)

=== Translations ===
- Souls Left Behind: A WW1 Chinese Labour Corps Novel, by Fan Wu (Sinoist Books, 2024) -- trans. by Honey Watson
- The Unfilial: Four Tragic Tales from Modern China, by Yao Emei (Sinoist Books, 2024) -- trans. by Will Spence, Olivia Milburn, Honey Watson and Martin Wards
- Midnight Stories: A short story collection from the mind behind Raise the Red Lantern, by Su Tong (Sinoist Books, 2024) -- trans. by Honey Watson

=== Video games ===
- Zero Parades for Dead Spies, ZAUM (2026), Writer

== See also ==
- List of Chinese-English translators
