= Zero Parades: For Dead Spies =

2026 video game

- Developer: ZA/UM
- Publisher: ZA/UM
- Producers: Allen Murray; Ruudu Ulas
- Designers: Matthew Clarke; Tõnis Haavel; Mia Torr
- Programmers: Kay Ross; Andre Constantino
- Artists: Kaspar Tamsalu; Anton Vill
- Writers: Siim “Kosmos” Sinamäe; Justin Keenan; Patrick O Riain
- Composer: Fernando Cabrera
- Platforms: Windows; Nintendo Switch 2; PlayStation 5; Xbox Series X/S
- Release: Windows; 21 May 2026; Director's Cut; Windows; 1 October 2026; Switch 2, PS5, Xbox Series X/S; 3 November 2026
- Genre: Role-playing
- Mode: Single-player

Zero Parades: For Dead Spies is a 2026 role-playing video game by ZA/UM. It is the studio's second game following Disco Elysium. It was released in May 2026 for Windows. Much like Disco Elysium, it received an enhanced version, titled Zero Parades: Director's Cut, which launched as a free update for the PC version in October 2026, followed by Nintendo Switch 2, PlayStation 5 and Xbox Series X/S versions in November the same year.

== Gameplay ==
Zero Parades is a single-player role-playing video game presented in isometric view. The player controls Hershel Wilk (alias "Cascade"), a female operative in a fictional world. She has been sent to the city-state of Portofiro on a covert mission. Hershel can explore Portofiro and interact with objects and its residents to start dialog trees to learn more information and find useful gear. Similar to the main player-character of Disco Elysium, Hershel has a split psyche, and rather than resolving conflicts through combat, the player instead makes skill checks against these facets of their psyche or other characters. Unlike in Disco Elysium, the player can opt to exert additional effort, gaining an extra die on these skill checks, but at the cost of affecting one or more different stress levels on Hershel, such as anxiety. Other actions can also raise or lower these stress levels. Zero Parades also added "dramatic encounters", chains of events that the player must commit to one of several options at each step, often based on skill checks, to pass.

== Synopsis ==
=== Setting ===
Gameplay screenshot.

Zero Parades: For Dead Spies takes place in a world with three dominant factions: the Superbloc (formally the Supreme Union of Proletarian Republics), a federation of communist states; the Developed World, a loose association of post-industrial capitalist states under the aegis of the powerful investment bank EMTERR (l'Empire sans Territoire); and La Luz (the Illuminated Empire), an authoritarian monarchy guided by an eschatological ideology it calls techno-fascism. The current date is the year 96 of an era named the End of History. This era commenced with the signing of the Latour-Woolgar Treaty, which created an international legal framework to reduce wars between countries. While the Superbloc and the Developed World remain in opposition, they have grown complacent over decades of relative peace, and La Luz now exploits loopholes and its rivals' aversion to conflict to forcefully reassert control over its many former colonies around the world.

The events of the game occur entirely in Portofiro, an island city-state fallen on hard times that was once a Luzian penal colony. Portofiro is now nominally part of the Developed World due to taking on multiple EMTERR loans, but the Superbloc maintains an interest in it and the threat of Luzian re-annexation looms on the horizon. Five years ago, the Superbloc's network of assets in Portofiro was leaked to the Weeping Eye, the secret police of La Luz. The operant Hershel Wilk headed the network and was the only member who escaped Portofiro before the Weeping Eye closed in. As punishment for her failure Hershel's superiors at the Superbloc's Operant Bureau have re-assigned her to a desk job at a filing complex known as The Freezer for the past five years. In the present, Hershel is released and sent back to Portofiro on a new assignment.

=== Plot ===
Operant Hershel Wilk, alias CASCADE, arrives at an Operant Bureau safehouse in Portofiro and finds that her partner, PSEUDOPOD, has been incapacitated and cannot brief her on their joint assignment. Seeking to avoid being sent back to the Freezer, Hershel retraces PSEUDOPOD's last steps across Portofiro's Quisach district. She learns one of her old assets, the crime boss Tempo del Sur, had important intel pertaining to La Luz that he wanted to trade to the Superbloc. The Operant Bureau sent PSEUDOPOD to make contact, but Tempo refused to speak to anyone other than Hershel. The reason Hershel was let out of the Freezer was to vouch for PSEUDOPOD so he could take over as Tempo's handler. Upon discovering signs that Tempo was recently killed by the Weeping Eye, Hershel shifts her investigation to figuring out what Tempo's intel was.

Eventually, Hershel pieces together that La Luz and EMTERR were preparing to hold secret, high-level treaty negotiations in Portofiro. Luzian Minister of Mass Culture Facundo Reyes, one the Superbloc's most reviled foes, had reached out to EMTERR and offered to end La Luz's re-annexation campaigns in exchange for EMTERR lifting its Culture Blockade on La Luz, which was preventing Luzian media and consumer products from being imported by the Developed World. Simultaneously, Minister Reyes' assistant, Dante Augustino, sought to defect to the Superbloc. Dante made a deal with Tempo to trade sensitive Luzian technology for travel documents he could not otherwise obtain, but by coincidence Dante was abducted and imprisoned by EMTERR operants for unrelated reasons before he could leave Portofiro.

Hershel is ordered by the Operant Bureau to assassinate Minister Reyes, which would involve ambushing him when he makes a private visit to a Luzian monument site before the negotiations start. Unexpectedly, the man whom Hershel encounters at the monument identifies himself as Dante Augustino, and claims he is the body double of the real minister. In truth, the real Facundo had assumed his body double's identity to defect, and he was the man whom EMTERR unwittingly took captive, while the real Dante was brought to Portofiro by the head of the Weeping Eye, Tesoro Buendia, to stage Facundo's assassination at the monument and thereby provide a casus belli for a Luzian invasion of Portofiro.

Tesoro and a team of Weeping Eye operants round up Hershel and her allies. As the group returns to the city by tram, from where Hershel will be transported to La Luz for a show trial and public execution, Hershel turns the tables with her allies' help. Tesoro and his henchmen are eliminated, and Hershel once again flees Portofiro ahead of the fallout. Hershel calls her handler, Melita, who evaluates the assignment based on the outcomes of various choices she made, with the most important factor being whether the real Facundo Reyes is alive and still in EMTERR's possession, alive and walking free, or dead. Regardless of Hershel's final evaluation score, it is indicated that the events in Portofiro will have global ramifications, and the Superbloc, EMTERR, and La Luz are each preparing for a possible war.

== Development and release ==
ZA/UM was formed in 2016 by Estonian novelist Robert Kurvitz to develop Disco Elysium based on his 2013 novel Sacred and Terrible Air, inspired by Planescape: Torment. The game set itself apart from other role-playing games in that it lacked combat, instead the player resolved encounters through skill checks made against the internal voices of the protagonist's fragmented persona. Disco Elysium won several year-end gaming awards, and is considered one of the greatest video games of all time.

Despite its success, there were several legal issues that surrounded ZA/UM after the release of Disco Elysium, during which Kurvitz and other founders of ZA/UM left the studio. ZA/UM initially planned to continue with development of prequel and sequels of Disco Elysium, but internal studio struggles led to cancellation of these projects and additional layoffs. Of the remaining projects by 2024 was a mobile version of Disco Elysium and a unrelated project named C4.

ZA/UM revealed C4 as Zero Parades in March 2025, which ZA/UM said was not connected in story or setting with Disco Elysium, nor considered as a spiritual successor. Writers Siim "Kosmos" Sinamäe and Honey Watson said that unlike Disco Elysium which was a cop story, Zero Parades is a spy story, where there is necessarily no right or wrong action, making the game more suitable to the systems they had developed for it. Zero Parades was inspired primarily by the spy novels of John le Carré, which Watson said were more intellectual compared to James Bond, and about a person doing "sneaky, horrible things" as part of their espionage, and allows the player to opt to role-play more directly with Hershel. Additionally, the works of Ursula K. Le Guin and Thomas Pynchon inspired the story.

The game released for Windows on 21 May 2026.

=== Director's Cut ===
In September 2026, ZA/UM announced Zero Parades: Director's Cut, an enhanced version which adds many improvements and new content to the game, including re-recorded English voice-overs, a new Dramatic Encounter called Quisach Roundabout, reworked inventory management, new outfits and clothing, ultrawide support for 21:9 and 32:9 monitors, more accessibility features, and a new mode called "Backstage", which allows players to experience older versions of select levels and view audio stories and commentary from developers about the game's development. It launched on 1 October 2026 as a free update for the existing owners of the PC version, with a version for Playstation 5 following on 3 November 2026. Versions of Zero Parades: Director's Cut for Nintendo Switch 2 and Xbox Series X/S were announced on 15 October and 20 October respectively, and released on the same day as Playstation 5 version.

== Reception ==
Reception

Aggregate scores
Aggregator	Score
Metacritic	83/100 (Note: Based on 58 reviews)
OpenCritic	88% recommend (Note: Based on 65 reviews)

Review scores
Publication	Score
Destructoid	9/10
Eurogamer	5/5
GameSpot	8/10
Giant Bomb	4.5/5
RPGFan	6.5/10

Zero Parades: For Dead Spies received "generally favorable" reviews according to review aggregator website Metacritic. OpenCritic reported that 87% of critics recommended it. Ben Love of RPGFan writes that the game is engaging, while the world feels "less alive" than Disco Elysium and that the protagonist is underdeveloped. The review by GameSpot compliments the writing, while noting that it "tries too hard to imitate Disco Elysium", a theme shared by another review by SiliconEra. Aidan O'Brien of Destructoid calls the game "an excellent, narrative-focused RPG that embraces both self-awareness and the desire for more."

In July 2026, ZA/UM announced a round of layoffs and redundancies because sales were lower than necessary to sustain the studio. 32 staff from across the studio were released.
