= Kaur Kender =

Estonian author and entrepreneur (born 1971)

- Born: 27 May 1971 (age 55)
- Citizenship: Estonia
- Occupation: Writer
- Writing career
- Language: Estonian
- Period: 1998 – present
- Genre: Literary fiction

Kaur Kender (born 27 May 1971) is an Estonian author, entrepreneur, and advertising executive. Kender entered the Estonian literary scene in 1998 with his debut novel, Independence Day (transl. Iseseisvuspäev), which has been translated into Finnish (2001) and Russian (2003).

== Career ==
Kender subsequently published the novels Yuppie God (1999), Abnormal (2000), and Check Out (2001). He has also written collaborative works: Through Peaceful Eyes (2001) with Heikki Erich Merila, and Raha (2002) with banker Rain Lõhmus. Eesti Päevaleht has identified Kender's work as one of the "most scandalous" in Estonian contemporary works.

In 2013, Kender was made the acting editor-in-chief for the cultural newspaper Sirp after a failed contest to fill the role and a round of layoffs. The move was seen by cultural figures as an attempt by the culture minister Rein Lang to exert political influence over the newspaper, which led to Lang announcing his resignation on November 21. Kender resigned from his post on November 25 after he and Robert Kurvitz, his longtime collaborator and an editor under his wing, were accused of copyright infringement for publishing an unpublished work by poet Andres Aule.

Kender provided both input and investment to support Robert Kurvitz's novel, Sacred and Terrible Air (2013). In 2014, Kender published a novel called Untitled 12, which received mixed reactions in Estonian society. The Finnish Pen described it as a "grotesque thriller" and an important book discussing taboos central to the entertainment industry, including death, serial murder, pornography, and pedophilia. In early 2016, he was charged with writing child pornography and put on trial but was later acquitted. In 2025, Kender claimed that Robert Kurvitz, not he, was the author of Untitled 12. He wrote under the pseudonym Kras Mazov on the RPGcodex forum: “I haven't even read it. I'm just a shitposter.”

Kender moved to London in 2017 to act as an early investor and Executive Producer for the video game Disco Elysium, which achieved critical and commercial success for the development team ZA/UM. Disco Elysium won multiple British Academy Games Awards, including one for narrative. Kender jokingly said that Disco Elysium was funded by "four Fs": Friends, Fools, Family and Kender's Ferrari, which formerly belonged to Dolph Lundgren. The origins of the game were detailed in articles by GamesRadar and PC Gamer.

== Bibliography ==
- Iseseisvuspäev; English translation: Independence Day (1998, ISBN 978-9949-684-99-1)
- Yuppiejumal; English translation: Yuppiegod (1999, ISBN 978-9985-79-510-1)
- Ebanormaalne; English translation: Abnormal (2000, ISBN 978-9985-79-362-6)
- Läbi rahulike silmade; English translation: Through Peaceful Eyes (2001, ISBN 9985-9291-9-5)
- Check Out (2001, ISBN 978-9949-38-958-2)
- Pangapettus; English translation: Bank Con (2002, ISBN 978-9985-9424-8-2)
- Kuidas saada isaks; English translation: How to Become a Father (2003, ISBN 978-9949-10-306-5)
- Raha; English translation: Money (2002, ISBN 978-9985-78-428-0) (together with Rain Lõhmus)
- Comeback (2010, ISBN 978-9985-79-463-0)
- Untitled 12 (2014, ISBN 978-1-5308-4165-3)
