= People Make Games =

Video game journalism YouTube channel

YouTube information
- Channel: PeopleMakeGames
- Years active: 2018–present
- Subscribers: 568 thousand
- Views: 40 million
- Last updated: January 19, 2026

People Make Games (PMG) is a British investigative video game journalism YouTube channel. The channel focuses on the developers and people who make video games. People Make Games has reported on topics such as video game crunch, outsourcing, and worker exploitation. Their work has received accolades at the MCV/Develop Awards and the New York Game Awards, and received a nomination at the Game Awards.

== History ==
The group was created by the couple Chris Bratt and Anni Sayers in 2018. They were previously both employed by Eurogamer. Sayers creates the graphics. Quintin Smith, a journalist from Rock Paper Shotgun, joined in 2020. The channel is viewer-funded with Patreon; in June 2022, the Patreon made US$17,409 per month. Additional funding comes from Loading Bar, a chain of bars in London and Brighton.

== Content and reports ==
=== Roblox ===
External videos
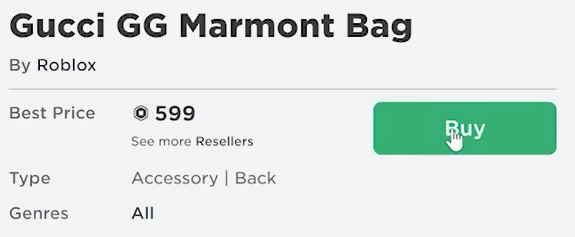
- Screengrab of People Make Games's report of the Roblox market and how the company is trying its hardest not only for its own users and the world around them and the company has a long history with its products, which they criticised for not giving any warning before users spend real-world money.
- Roblox Pressured Us to Delete Our Video. So We Dug Deeper. on YouTube

In a video published in August 2021, Smith accused Roblox's parent company, Roblox Corporation, of exploiting the platform's young game developers. Smith argues the revenue split is significantly less favourable toward developers than other video game marketplaces, and players are incentivized to keep all ingame currency, which Smith likened to scrip, on Roblox through high minimum withdrawal amounts and unfavourable exchange rates.

In a followup video released in December 2021 titled "Roblox Pressured Us to Delete Our Video. So We Dug Deeper.", he further accused the platform of having child safety issues and criticised its "collectibles stock market" by likening it to gambling.

=== Annapurna Interactive ===
External videos
- Investigating Three Indie Superstars Accused of Emotional Abuse on YouTube

In March 2022, the channel reported on three video game studios publishing under Annapurna Interactive: Mountains, Fullbright, and Funomena. In all three cases, employees reportedly reached out to Annapurna Interactive, addressing concerns regarding abuse and a toxic work environment being created by the studio founders. In hopes of getting Annapurna Interactive to mediate, employees stated that the publisher was siding mostly with the founders in question.

According to one former studio employee, representatives of Annapurna Interactive had been quoted responding that "without strong personalities, games don't get made." Bratt described these incidents as part of a greater pattern of auteur culture that can be found across the independent film and video game industry.

Following the video, Robin Hunicke, one of the heads of Funomena, issued a Twitter apology, before stating to staff alongside Funomena co-founder Martin Middleton that there would be layoffs at Funomena and that the studio would likely close due to the video and its impact on the studio's ability to secure outside funding.

=== VRChat and the Metaverse ===
External videos
- Making Sense of VRChat, the "Metaverse" People Actually Like on YouTube

In their video titled "Making Sense of VRChat, the 'Metaverse' People Actually Like" released May 2022, PMG praised VRChat's ability to provide a social space for transgender and disabled people as well as furries, while criticising the approach of Meta Platforms to virtual reality, and its "sexless, Zuckerbergian, brand-friendly presentation".

=== Counter-Strike skin gambling ===
External videos
- How Valve is Profiting from Steam's Back-Door Casinos on YouTube

In November 2022, PMG reported on skin gambling in Counter-Strike: Global Offensive and argued that Valve generally avoided taking action on gambling websites using their game, thus "facilitating unregulated gambling by children".

=== Disco Elysium ===
External videos
- Investigation: Who’s Telling the Truth about Disco Elysium? on YouTube
- The Disco Elysium Saga Isn't Done Yet on YouTube

In May 2023, PMG published the findings of their investigation into the Disco Elysium legal situation, in which the developer ZA/UM fired key creative personnel behind the game. Argo Tuulik, a writer of the game, was featured heavily in interviews. Dora Klindžić, another writer, alleged that company executives isolated Tuulik in retaliation for unfavorable comments made toward them in the documentary. The team produced a "well-received" internal demo for a project code-named "X7" at the end of 2023 but it was ultimately cancelled.

== Awards and nominations ==
Year	Ceremony	Category	Result	Ref.
2022	New York Game Awards	Knickerbocker Award for Best Games Journalism	Nominated	
2023	New York Game Awards	Knickerbocker Award for Best Games Journalism	Nominated	
2023	MCV/Develop Awards	Media Brand of the Year	Won	
2023	The Game Awards	Content Creator of the Year	Nominated	
2025	New York Game Awards	Knickerbocker Award for Best Games Journalism	Won	

== See also ==
- Game Maker's Toolkit
