= Disco Elysium =

2019 video game

- Game cover, featuring the lead characters Harry (front, right) and Kim (left)
- Developer: ZA/UM
- Publisher: ZA/UM
- Designer: Robert Kurvitz
- Artist: Aleksander Rostov
- Writer: Robert Kurvitz
- Composer: British Sea Power
- Engine: Unity
- Platforms: Windows; macOS; PlayStation 4; PlayStation 5; Stadia; Nintendo Switch; Xbox One; Xbox Series X/S; Android
- Release: 15 October 2019: Windows; 15 October 2019; macOS; 27 April 2020; Android; 5 August 2025; The Final Cut; macOS, PS4, PS5, Stadia, Win; 30 March 2021; Switch, XBO, XSX/S; 12 October 2021
- Genre: Role-playing
- Mode: Single-player

Disco Elysium is a 2019 role-playing video game by ZA/UM. The game was written and designed by a team led by Estonian novelist Robert Kurvitz and executive producer Kaur Kender, featuring a painterly art style and music by the English band Sea Power. It was released for Windows in October 2019 and macOS in April 2020. An expanded version of the game featuring full voice acting and new content, subtitled The Final Cut, was released for consoles in 2021 alongside a free update for the PC versions. In August 2025, the game was adapted for Android.

Disco Elysium follows a troubled detective with no memory of his identity or the world around him. As he investigates a murder with a detective from another precinct, the player can piece together the protagonist's identity and discover what led him to his state. Disco Elysium is a non-traditional role-playing game featuring little combat. Instead, events are resolved through skill checks and dialogue trees using a system of 24 skills representing the protagonist's different aspects and personalities, each of which can speak directly to the player to influence their decisions. The game is based on a tabletop role-playing game setting that Kurvitz had created before forming ZA/UM in 2016 to adapt it into a video game. This is the second time the Elysium setting is explored, following the 2013 novel Sacred and Terrible Air.

Disco Elysium received critical acclaim upon its release, winning numerous awards, notably at the Game Awards 2019 (Best Independent Game, Best Narrative, Best Role Playing Game, Fresh Indie Game). It has sold more than five million copies, and is regarded by some critics as one of the greatest video games of all time, and a strong example of video games as an art form. Though a success, conflicts at ZA/UM around 2021 led several of the lead developers and writers, including Kurvitz and Kender, to leave and form their own studios. ZA/UM released Zero Parades: For Dead Spies in May 2026, a game in the same style as Disco Elysium, while as of October 2024, at least four different studios employing former ZA/UM staff had announced projects to develop spiritual successors to Disco Elysium.

== Gameplay ==
Gameplay screenshot showing conversations in white and choices in orange, atop the current scene the character is in

Disco Elysium is a role-playing video game that features an open world and dialogue-heavy gameplay mechanics. The game is presented in an isometric perspective in which the player character is controlled. The player takes the role of a detective, who suffers from alcohol and drug-induced amnesia, on a murder case. The player can move the detective about the screen to interact with non-player characters (NPC) and highlighted objects or move onto other screens. Early in the game, the player gains a partner, Kim Kitsuragi, another detective who acts as the protagonist's voice of professionalism and who offers advice or support in certain dialogue options.

The gameplay features no combat in the traditional sense; instead, combat is handled through skill checks and dialogue trees. There are four primary attributes in the game: Intellect, Psyche, Physique, and Motorics. Each attribute has six distinct secondary skills for a total of 24, which the player can improve through skill points earned from levelling up. Upgrading these skills helps the player character pass skill checks, which are based on a random roll of two six-sided dice, but potentially result in negative effects and character quirks, discouraging minmaxing. For instance, a player character with high Drama may be able to detect and fabricate lies effectively, but may also become prone to hysterics and paranoia. Likewise, high Electrochemistry shields the player character from the negative effects of drugs and provides knowledge on them, but may also lead to substance abuse and other self-destructive, self-gratifying behaviours. The choice of clothing that the player equips on the player-character can also impart both positive and negative effects on certain skills.

Disco Elysium features a secondary skill system known as the "Thought Cabinet". Thoughts are unlocked through conversations with other characters and internal dialogues within the protagonist's mind. The player is then able to "internalize" a thought through a certain amount of in-game hours, which, once completed, grants the player character benefits but also occasionally negative effects, a concept that ZA/UM compared to the trait system used in the Fallout series. A limited number of slots are available in the Thought Cabinet at the start, though more can be gained with experience levels. For example, an early possible option for the Thought Cabinet is the "Hobocop" thought, in which the character ponders the option of living on the streets to save money, which reduces the character's composure with other NPCs while the thought is being internalized. When the character has completed the Hobocop thought, it allows the player to receive twice as much money from collecting and recycling trash. Later, the player may opt to spend a skill point to "forget" completed thoughts to make space for different ones. This removes it from the Thought Cabinet for the rest of the playthrough, along with any bonuses gained from its completion.

The 24 skills also play into the dialogue trees, creating a situation where the player-character may have internal debates with one or more aspects of either mind or body, creating the idea that the player is communicating with a fragmented persona. These internal conversations may provide suggestions or additional insight that can guide the player into actions or dialogue with the game's non-playable characters, depending on the skill points invested into the skill. For example, Inland Empire, a subskill of Psyche, is described by ZA/UM as a representation of the intensity of the soul, and may come into situations where the player-character may need to pass themselves off under a fake identity with the conviction behind that stance, should the player accept this suggestion when debating with Inland Empire.

== Synopsis ==
The star and antlers flag of communists in the world of Disco Elysium

=== Setting ===
Disco Elysium takes place in the fictional world of Elysium, developed by Kurvitz and his team in the years prior, which includes over six thousand years of history; the genre is described as "fantastic realism". The narrative was constructed with attention to Karl Marx's theory of history, which posits that the material production of life directly conditions the political, artistic, religious, and philosophical superstructure of society in itself.

The game takes place in the year '51 of the Current Century. Elysium is made of "isolas", masses of land and sea that are separated from each other by the Pale, an inscrutable, mist-like "connective tissue" in which the laws of reality break down. Prolonged exposure to the Pale can cause mental instability and eventually death, and traversing the Pale, which is typically done with aerostatics, is heavily regulated due to the danger.

Events in the game take place in the impoverished district of Martinaise within the city of Revachol on the isola of Insulinde, the "New New World". Forty-nine years before the events of the game, a wave of communist revolutions swept multiple countries; the Suzerainty of Revachol, a monarchy that up to that point had been Elysium's pre-eminent superpower, was overthrown and replaced by a commune. Six years later, the Commune of Revachol was toppled by an invading alliance of moralist-capitalist nations called "the Coalition". Revachol was designated a Special Administrative Region and remains firmly under Coalition control decades later. One of the few governmental responsibilities that the Coalition concedes to the people of Revachol is policing, which is carried out by the Revachol Citizens Militia (RCM), a voluntary citizens' brigade turned semi-professional police force.

=== Plot ===
The player character wakes up in a trashed hostel room in Martinaise with a severe hangover and no memory of his own identity due to an ostensible extreme case of drug-induced amnesia. He meets Lieutenant Kim Kitsuragi, who informs him that they have been assigned to investigate the death of a hanged man in an empty lot behind the hostel. The victim's identity is unclear and initial analysis of the scene indicates that he was lynched by a group of people. The detectives explore the rest of the district, following up on leads while helping residents with a variety of tasks. In the course of the investigation, the player character learns that he is a decorated RCM detective, Lieutenant Harrier "Harry" Du Bois. Harry experienced an event several years ago that began a midlife crisis, and on the night he was assigned to the hanged man case, he snapped and embarked on a self-destructive three-day drinking spree around Martinaise. When the player goes to bed on the first night in-game, Harry has a nightmare where he discovers himself as the hanged man underneath a disco ball. When he talks to his own dead body, it tells him that everything is hopeless and he will inevitably fail to solve the case or put his life back together.

Harry and Kim discover the hanged man killing is connected to an ongoing strike by the Martinaise dockworkers' union against the Wild Pines Group, a major logistics corporation. They interview union boss Evrart Claire and Wild Pines negotiator Joyce Messier. Joyce reveals that the hanged man was Colonel Ellis "Lely" Kortenaer, the commander of a squad of mercenaries sent by Wild Pines to break the strike. She warns that the rest of the mercenaries have gone rogue and will likely seek retribution for Lely's death.

Harry and Kim discover that Lely was killed before the hanging, and the Hardie Boys, a group of dockworker vigilantes who act as the de facto peacekeepers of Martinaise, claim responsibility for the murder. They assert that Lely raped a hostel guest named Klaasje. When questioned, Klaasje reveals that Lely was shot in the mouth while the two were having consensual sex. Unable to figure out the origin of the bullet and fearful of the authorities due to her past as a corporate spy, Klaasje enlisted the help of a union sympathiser named Ruby, who staged Lely's hanging with the rest of the Hardie Boys. The detectives find Ruby hiding in an abandoned building, where she incapacitates them with a radio wave-based device normally used to aid in traversing the Pale. She claims that the cover-up was Klaasje's idea and has no idea who shot Lely. Harry manages to overcome the Pale device and contemplates arresting Ruby, but she believes Harry to be a corrupt cop and either escapes or kills herself, depending on the player's skills and choices.

Returning to their hostel, the detectives intercede in a standoff between the rogue mercenaries and the Hardie Boys. A firefight breaks out and Harry is wounded, leaving him unconscious for several days. Depending on the player's actions, none, some, or all of the Hardie Boys and mercenaries may die, and Kim may also be hospitalized, in which case street urchin Cuno offers to take his place as Harry's partner. The detectives chase down their remaining leads and determine that the shot that killed Lely came from an old fortress on an islet just off of Martinaise's shoreline.

The detectives explore the ruins and find the shooter, a former commissar of the Revachol communist army named Iosef Lilianovich Dros who survived the collapse of the Revacholian commune because he deserted his post. Iosef reveals that he shot Lely with his sniper rifle in a fit of anger and jealousy; his motivations were born out of his bitterness towards the capitalist system Lely represented, as well as sexual envy for Klaasje. The detectives arrest him for the murder. At this point, an insectoid cryptid known as the Insulindian Phasmid appears from the reeds, whose existence the player has the choice to investigate throughout the game. It is implied that the Phasmid indirectly set off the chain of events leading to the murder, as the psychoactive chemicals it exudes inadvertently affected the man's mind for years, stoking his fanaticism and resentment. Harry may have a psychic conversation with the Phasmid, who tells him that it is fearful of the notion of his unstable mind, but awed by his ability to continue existing. It also implies to Harry that the Pale is a consequence of human perception and self-reflection that threatens to consume the world. Before leaving, it comforts Harry, telling him to move on from the wreck of his life.

Harry and his partner are confronted by his old squad upon their return to Martinaise. They reflect on Harry's actions during the game, particularly whether he solved the case and how he handled the mercenaries. Lieutenant Jean Vicquemare, Harry's usual partner, confirms that Harry's emotional breakdown was the result of his fiancée leaving him years ago. In the best possible outcome, the squad expresses hope that Harry's state will improve in the future, and invites him and either Kim or Cuno to join a special RCM unit.

== Development ==
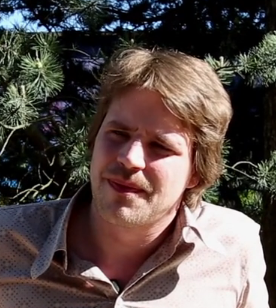
Robert Kurvitz, the lead designer and writer for Disco Elysium, in 2014

Disco Elysium was developed by ZA/UM, a company founded in 2016 by Estonian novelist Robert Kurvitz, who served as the game's lead writer and designer. In 2005, Kurvitz was playing in a band called Ultramelanhool and conceived of a fictional world during a drunken evening while listening to Tiësto's "Adagio for Strings". The group then created a collective of artists and musicians, which included oil painter Aleksander Rostov, the lead artist of Disco Elysium, to expand upon the work of that night and developed a tabletop role-playing game based on Dungeons & Dragons on this steampunk-like concept. During this period, Kurvitz met Estonian author Kaur Kender, who helped him to write a novel set in this world, Sacred and Terrible Air, which was published in 2013 but only sold about one thousand copies. Kurvitz fell into a period of depression and alcoholism for about three years following the book's commercial failure. This failure, along with Kurvitz and Rostov's teenage experience with Dungeons and Dragons, would inspire the design philosophy of embracing failure. This can be seen both in the "failure of a cop" main character: Harrier Dubois, the many tragedies surrounding the characters and world, and the RPG pass-fail dice system. This would also go on to inspire one of their scrapped taglines "A Roleplaying Game About Being a Total Failure".

Kurvitz eventually managed to overcome his alcoholism and helped Kender in his own recovery. As a sign of gratitude, Kender suggested to Kurvitz that instead of pursuing a novel, he could try capturing his world as a video game to draw a larger interest. Kurvitz had no experience in video games, but once he saw the artwork of the game's setting easily fitting into an isometric format, as well as Rostov's agreement that they might as well continue taking the risk of failing on a video game together, Kurvitz proceeded with the idea. Kurvitz wrote a concise description of what the game would be: "D&D meets '70s cop-show, in an original 'fantastic realist' setting, with swords, guns and motor-cars. Realised as an isometric CRPG – a modern advancement on the legendary Planescape: Torment and Baldur's Gate. Massive, reactive story. Exploring a vast, poverty-stricken ghetto. Deep, strategic combat." Kender was impressed by the strong statement and invested into the game's development, with additional investment coming from friends and family. The game was announced as an upcoming 2017 game under the title No Truce With the Furies, taken from the poem "Reflections" by R.S. Thomas and published in Thomas' No Truce with the Furies in 1995. Although the name was changed, the poem would later find its own place in the game as an excerpt of the poem appears in the opening:

"The Furies are at home in the mirror, it is their address. Even the clearest water, if deep enough can drown. -R.S Thomas

Kurvitz established the ZA/UM team to create the game, using the name "za um", a reference to the Zaum constructed language created by Russian avant-garde poets in the early 1900s. Its name can be read in Russian as a shortcut for the idiom взяться за ум (vzyat'sya za um), which is similar to the English idea of bootstrapping. The use of all-capitals and the slash symbol is to present the team as "something that definitely exists and weighs eight tonnes". Work on the game started around 2016, with the local team living in a squat in a former gallery in Tallinn. They were able to secure venture capital into the game during the first year, which allowed Kurvitz to seek out the English band British Sea Power for music for the game's soundtrack. While in Birmingham to speak to the band, Kurvitz realised England was a better location for the main development team as there were more local resources for both development and for voice-overs. During development, some of the staff relocated from Estonia to London and Brighton, with other designers working out of Poland, Romania, and China. Overall, by the time of the game's release, ZA/UM had about 20 outside consultants and 35 in-house developers, with a team of eight writers assisting Kurvitz in the game's dialogue. The majority of the game's funding was provided by Estonian businessman Margus Linnamäe. The game uses the Unity engine.

Kurvitz said that an aim was to have a full, complex depth of choices and outcomes, limited by the practicalities of game development. Knowing they could not realistically cover all possible choices, Kurvitz and his team instead focused more on what he called "microreactivity", small acts and decisions the player may make such as an embarrassing comment, and how that may propagate throughout events. The dialogue of the player's various skills helped then to provide critique and internalisation of how these small decisions had larger effects on the game world, so that the player would become more aware of such choices in the future. An additional factor in writing was the recognition that there was no real solution to the game; while the player may resolve some portions of the story, the primary case is nearly unworkable, similar to the rest of Revachol. They created the companion Kim as a no-nonsense character to help keep the player on track of resolving some part of the game and recognising that there were some story threads they simply could not fix or resolve.

As originally planned, the game was to focus on action in a single city location to make the 2017 release. However, as ZA/UM had indicated to investors that this was to be a game that spanned a larger world, they found the need to spread beyond that single location, forcing them to delay the game's release, along with the name change to Disco Elysium. This title plays on a few double meanings related to the word "disco"; in one sense, it refers to ideas that briefly gain the spotlight before burning out similar to the fad of disco music, and reflected in the protagonist's clothing style, while in a more literal sense, "disco" is Latin for "I learn", thus reflecting on the protagonist's overcoming his amnesia to learn about the world of Elysium. Kurvitz had always anticipated the No Truce title to be more of a working title and wanted to reserve it for when they had bundled Disco Elysium with a second planned game. Though ZA/UM had initially planned to publish the game through Humble Bundle, they ultimately chose to self-publish it.

In March 2025, ZA/UM announced an official mobile version of Disco Elysium for Android, aimed at engaging more casual users. The game released on Google Play on August 5, 2025, taking the form of a visual novel.

=== Influences and inspirations ===
The game's art, drawn mostly in a painterly style, was led by Aleksander Rostov, while the soundtrack was written and recorded by the English band Sea Power (at the time of the game's publication, known as British Sea Power). Members of ZA/UM were longtime fans of the band, and approached the group directly to request the use of their music in Disco Elysium. The band agreed to produce the soundtrack, contributing a mix of original compositions and instrumental remixes of previously released songs. Several tracks from Sea Power's discography were reworked for the game's soundtrack. "Smallest Church in Sussex", from their 2003 debut The Decline of British Sea Power, was adapted into "The Smallest Church in Saint-Saëns". "Fire Escape in the Sea" from the 2012 EP2 became "Whirling-In-Rags, 8 AM". "Red Rock Riviera" from the 2012 documentary soundtrack From the Sea to the Land Beyond was reworked as "Instrument of Surrender". Two tracks from their 2017 album Let the Dancers Inherit the Party, "Wants to Be Free" and "Praise for Whatever", were transformed respectively into "Burn, Baby, Burn" and "The Insulindian Miracle". "Cleaning out the Rooms" from the 2011 album Valhalla Dancehall was remixed into both "Detective Arriving on the Scene" and "ZA/UM". The track "Tiger King" from the 2009 Man of Aran soundtrack was also remixed but retained its original title. Additionally, the name of the in-game hostel-cafeteria Whirling-in-Rags is derived from a lyric in the song "Hail Holy Queen" from the 2013 album Machineries of Joy.

The voice-acting cast includes metal musicians Mikee Goodman of SikTh and Mark Holcomb of Periphery. The original release also had voice-acting by Dasha Nekrasova of the cultural commentary podcast Red Scare and four of the hosts from the left-wing political satire podcast, Chapo Trap House; these would later be replaced in The Final Cut.

In a Steam post published in January 2020, ZA/UM cited several works that influenced the writing and style of Disco Elysium. One major influence is the 1999 video game Planescape: Torment, which, like Disco Elysium, features an amnesiac player character, heavily emphasises dialogue, and is rendered isometrically. The television show The Wire was also used as an influence for the game's working class setting, while Émile Zola's writings shared stories on the misery of human life that narrative writer Helen Hindpere said she felt resonated within the game. Other works that influenced Disco Elysium included the video game Kentucky Route Zero; television shows True Detective and The Shield; literary references include Émile Zola's Germinal, Dashiell Hammett's The Glass Key, China Miéville's The City & The City (although this influence was denied by Kurvitz in an interview), and the Soviet sci-fi authors Arkady and Boris Strugatsky. For visual references, the developers mentioned painters Rembrandt, Ilya Repin, Jenny Saville, Alex Kanevsky, and Wassily Kandinsky.

Soviet artists Vladimir Mayakovsky and Viktor Tsoi as well as German philosophers Karl Marx and Friedrich Engels were notable political influences on the developers, with Hindpere thanking the four figures in her team's acceptance speech at The Game Awards.

Émile Zola is a significant literary influence on Disco Elysium. Lead writer Helen Hindpere has repeatedly expressed admiration for the French author, noting that both she and several other members of the studio are longtime fans of his work. Studio founder Robert Kurvitz has similarly acknowledged Zola's impact, stating during a conference in France that he does not consider himself a writer, as he prefers not to draw comparisons with literary figures of Zola's stature: “You are not going to be a better writer than Émile Zola.”

The creators have also said that their work owes a lot to the Estonian urbanist poet Arvi Siig. Kurvitz said while accepting the Estonian President's Young Cultural Figure annual award for 2020 "Without his modernism, Elysium – the world the game is placed in – would not be half of what it is." He also said Siig's vision of an international, radical and humanist Estonian culture lives on in Disco Elysium.

The main protagonist of Disco Elysium was directly inspired by producer Kaur Kender's father, who served as a detective in the Soviet police. The scene in which the protagonist vomits due to the stench of a decaying corpse is based on a real incident experienced by Kender's father during his career.

During a livestream, Robert Kurvitz cited Fallout as an influence, describing Disco Elysium as being “from the Fallout school of RPG.” He added that the original Fallout and Fallout 2 were among the first games to demonstrate that “video games can be forms of art.”

=== Re-release ===
An expanded and reworked edition of the game, subtitled The Final Cut, was announced in December 2020. According to lead writer Helen Hindpere, The Final Cut was directed based on input from players of the original game. It included complete voicework for the nearly 100 characters including the game's narration and the player-character skills, encompassing over 1.2 million words according to Hindpere. Because of the importance of the characters to the game, ZA/UM kept voice directing in-house rather than outsourcing the task as typically done with RPG games of this nature. It took about fourteen months to complete the global casting and recording processing for the additional voice overs. While they brought back some of the prior voice actors who had read introductory dialogue lines in conversation trees for their respective characters, ZA/UM sought out new voice actors they felt were a better fit for many roles, especially for minor characters. They came upon jazz musician Lenval Brown for the voice of the narrator and of the player skills, representing nearly half of the game's dialogue, and considered him essential to The Final Cut. Brown spent about eight months with the vocal directors in recording his lines, keeping his voice otherwise constant, slow and meticulous for all of the different characters skills since these were explaining things to the player, but including small nuances to try to distinguish the various facets of each skill's personality. The voice-acting by Nekrasova and the Chapo Trap House hosts was completely replaced. The Final Cut allows players the option to use a selection of voice acting for the game, such as only having the narrator's voiceover while the other characters presented as text.

There are four quests that were cut from the original game but reworked to explore some of the political implications of the game's story, now called Political Vision Quests. These quests were designed to encourage the player to consider how they have developed their player-character and where their decisions have taken the character, and how committed they are to seeing that out, according to Hindpere. Additionally, the expansion includes new art and animations, including two additional tracks by British Sea Power.

== Release ==
Disco Elysium was first released for Windows on 15 October 2019. The macOS version was released on 27 April 2020. One of the first translations that ZA/UM published was the Chinese version, which was released in March 2020. Its release had to bypass the typical approval process needed to release games in China, since Disco Elysium's content did not meet the Chinese governmental standards due to its violence, sexual content and critique of ideologies. After its release, reviews left by Chinese players indicated that they were drawn to the game, as they appreciated many of its political aspects. In May 2020, ZA/UM released an update that improved some of the game's performance on lower-end hardware, as well as adding support for additional language translations, which are being developed by the community and by the localisation firm Testronic Labs.

After its original release, Kurvitz announced plans for an expansion for the game as well as a full sequel. In addition, a tabletop RPG based on the systems the game used, tentatively titled You Are Vapor, was also announced, with Kurvitz also announcing plans to translate his novel Sacred and Terrible Air into English, which narratively takes place 20 years after the events of Disco Elysium. In June 2020, it was announced that ZA/UM had partnered with production company dj2 Entertainment to develop a television series based on the game. ZA/UM launched a limited edition clothing and artwork line, Atelier, in March 2021, featuring pieces based on the game.

=== The Final Cut ===
The Final Cut was released on 30 March 2021 for PlayStation 4, PlayStation 5 and Stadia as a free update for existing copies of the game on PC and macOS. Versions for Nintendo Switch, Xbox One and Xbox Series X/S were released on 12 October 2021. While the original game was not submitted for rating for the Australian Classification Board as it was only released digitally for personal computers, the planned console release of The Final Cut required a Board review. The game was refused classification by the Board, making it illegal to sell in the country, due to its depiction of sex, drug misuse or addiction, crime, cruelty, and violence, as well as showing "revolting or abhorrent phenomena in such a way that they offend against the standards of morality, decency, and propriety generally accepted by reasonable adults." The ban was appealed by ZA/UM then subsequently dropped, with the game reclassified to an adults-only R18+ rating and allowed to be sold, as the Board acknowledged that the game provided disincentives related to drug-taking behavior where "regular drug use leads to negative consequences for the player's progression in the game." The game was released by Spike Chunsoft in Japan on 25 August 2022.

== Reception ==
Reception

Aggregate scores
Aggregator	Score
Metacritic	91/100
OpenCritic	96% recommend

Review scores
Publication	Score
Destructoid	8.5/10
Edge	9/10
Game Informer	9/10
GameSpot	10/10
IGN	9.6/10
PC Gamer (US)	92/100
PCGamesN	9/10
USgamer	4.5/5

Disco Elysium received "universal acclaim" according to review aggregator website Metacritic, with it being praised for its narrative and conversational systems. Fellow review aggregator OpenCritic assessed that the game received "mighty" approval, being recommended by 96% of critics.

PC Gamer praised the game for its depth, freedom, customisation, and storytelling and called it one of the best RPGs on the PC. IGN praised the game's open world and compared it favourably to The Witcher 3 and Red Dead Redemption 2, despite being much smaller. The Washington Post said that the game is "conspicuously well written". GameSpot awarded it a 10 out of 10, their first perfect score since 2017.

PCGamesN wrote that the game set new genre standards for exploration and conversation systems. Conversely, Eurogamer criticised the game for not offering enough choice in role-playing and for a distinct lack of focus.

In a review of Disco Elysium in Black Gate, Joshua Dinges said "The nihilistic world is remarkably well fleshed out, the non-player characters earnestly realized, and the myriad plot threads extremely engaging. You may have no idea what to do fifty percent of the time, but will still find yourself spending every available minute of the day carrying out nebulous tasks and exploring your fascinating surroundings. Surroundings which, I will add, are all gorgeously represented in the style of expressionist watercolors."

The Final Cut reception

Aggregate scores
Aggregator	Score
Metacritic	PC: 97/100; XSXS: 92/100; PS5: 89/100; PS4: 86/100; NS: 85/100
OpenCritic	93% recommend

Review scores
Publication	Score
Destructoid	7/10
Game Informer	9/10
GameSpot	10/10
Hardcore Gamer	4/5
IGN	10/10
Jeuxvideo.com	19/20
Nintendo Life	9/10
PCMag	4.5/5
Push Square	9/10

Disco Elysium: The Final Cut was reviewed by IGN and Game Informer, both of which praised the addition of voice lines and new quests. The PlayStation releases were initially found to have game-breaking bugs that made some of the quests impossible to finish.

As of September 2025, Disco Elysium sold more than five million copies.

In June 2020, ZA/UM and dj2 Entertainment announced that a television series based on the game was under development.

=== Awards ===
The game was nominated for four awards at The Game Awards 2019 and won all of them, the most at the event. Slant Magazine, USGamer, PC Gamer, and Zero Punctuation chose it as their game of the year, while Time included it as one of their top 10 games of the 2010s. The game was also nominated for the 2020 Nebula Award for Best Game Writing.

Year	Award	Category	Result	Ref.
2019	Golden Joystick Awards	Ultimate Game of the Year	Nominated	
2019	The Game Awards 2019	Best Narrative	Won	
2019	The Game Awards 2019	Best Independent Game	Won	
2019	The Game Awards 2019	Best Role-Playing Game	Won	
2019	The Game Awards 2019	Fresh Indie Game (ZA/UM)	Won	
2020	23rd Annual D.I.C.E. Awards	Game of the Year	Nominated	
2020	23rd Annual D.I.C.E. Awards	Role-Playing Game of the Year	Nominated	
2020	23rd Annual D.I.C.E. Awards	Outstanding Achievement for an Independent Game	Nominated	
2020	23rd Annual D.I.C.E. Awards	Outstanding Achievement in Game Direction	Nominated	
2020	23rd Annual D.I.C.E. Awards	Outstanding Achievement in Game Design	Nominated	
2020	23rd Annual D.I.C.E. Awards	Outstanding Achievement in Story	Won	
2020	Nebula Awards	Best Game Writing	Nominated	
2020	20th Game Developers Choice Awards	Best Narrative	Won	
2020	20th Game Developers Choice Awards	Best Visual Art	Nominated	
2020	20th Game Developers Choice Awards	Best Debut (ZA/UM)	Won	
2020	20th Game Developers Choice Awards	Innovation Award	Nominated	
2020	SXSW Gaming Awards	Video Game of the Year	Nominated	
2020	SXSW Gaming Awards	Matthew Crump Cultural Innovation Award	Won	
2020	SXSW Gaming Awards	Excellence in Art	Nominated	
2020	SXSW Gaming Awards	Excellence in Design	Nominated	
2020	SXSW Gaming Awards	Excellence in Musical Score	Nominated	
2020	SXSW Gaming Awards	Excellence in Narrative	Won	
2020	16th British Academy Games Awards	Best Game	Nominated	
2020	16th British Academy Games Awards	Artistic Achievement	Nominated	
2020	16th British Academy Games Awards	Debut Game	Won	
2020	16th British Academy Games Awards	Game Design	Nominated	
2020	16th British Academy Games Awards	Music	Won	
2020	16th British Academy Games Awards	Narrative	Won	
2020	16th British Academy Games Awards	Original Property	Nominated	
2022	18th British Academy Games Awards	Evolving Game	Nominated	

== Post-release ==
=== Breakup of ZA/UM ===
Following the critical and commercial success of Disco Elysium, work immediately began on a direct sequel to the game as well as several spin-off projects. The direct sequel, code-named Y12, was led by Kurvitz, Rostov, and Hindpere. Another project, P1, was led by Kender. In October 2022, ZA/UM member Martin Luiga announced that he, Kurvitz, Rostov, and Hindpere of ZA/UM had "involuntarily left the company" in late 2021, stating that ZA/UM "no longer represents the ethos it was founded on." Luiga also affirmed that the ZA/UM cultural association had also been dissolved. In an interview, Luiga stated that the other three members had been fired under false pretenses. A spokesperson for ZA/UM denied the allegations.

In early November 2022, conflicting reports of the events were announced. According to Kurvitz, Zaum Studio OÜ, the development studio, was originally owned in majority shares by Margus Linnamäe, and was then acquired by Tütreke OÜ, a holding company owned by studio CEO Ilmar Kompus through a share purchase in 2021. Kurvitz and Rostov claimed that the funds used for that purchase were pulled from the studio itself, making it a fraudulent purchase, upon which they started to challenge the purchase and recover their IP from the studio. Among Kurvitz' and Rostov's complaints is that Kompus purchased four sketches from Zaum that were establishing the basis for a Disco Elysium sequel for £1, then resold these to Zaum for €4.8 million, effectively helping Kompus regain part of the money spent to acquire Zaum through Tütreke. Kurvitz and Rostov discovered the change in how the company was organised, including their demotion, and were fired when they began raising questions. Kurvitz and Rostov argued that they still have some control of the Disco Elysium intellectual property rights, and thus should have had a say in blocking the sale. Zaum Studio denied the charges in a statement, and alleged that the former employees had been let go for creating a disruptive environment at the studio, claiming that the two had "limited to no engagement in their responsibility and work", as well as verbally abused and discriminated against other employees. Other employees of Zaum Studio, speaking anonymously with GamesIndustry.biz, claimed the situation was "not black and white".

Legal proceedings in the matter were started by Kaur Kender, the executive producer of Disco Elysium. Kender had asked similar questions of the change in Zaum's management, leading to his firing. He filed suit asserting that Kompus owed him €1 million. Kender further asserted that Kompus was aided by Tõnis Haavel, an Estonian investor and Kompus' brother-in-law who had been convicted of fraud and was already €11.5 million in debt. Haavel has a majority share in Yessirnosir Ltd., a United Kingdom subsidiary of Zaum where the Disco Elysium rights are held. An initial hearing in Kender's case, which included statements from Kurvitz, was held in October 2022. By December 2022, Kender had dropped his lawsuit, as Kompus had paid back €4.8 million from Tütreke back to ZA/UM. Kurvitz and Rostov still assert that there were illegal actions to take over the development studio leading to their ouster.

The studio issued a statement on 14 March 2023 stating that all legal actions from the former members were concluded. Of Kender, he had "divested all his shares in the studio, repaid all his debts to the studio", and paid for the studio's legal fees under court order. Of Kurvitz and Rostov, the studio alleged that their lawsuit was dropped due to a lack of evidence. Further details of these cases remain confidential. On 17 March 2023, Kurvitz and Rostov responded to this statement by clarifying that the announcement was "wrong and misleading in several respects" and "[sought] to unfairly paint [them] - the remaining minority shareholders in ZA/UM - as mere disgruntled employees." Kurvitz and Rostov also stated that their lawsuit regarding employment claims against the studio was dismissed "as part of a larger campaign against [them]" and that they plan to "pursue legal options accordingly."

=== Abortive sequels and spinoffs ===
Following the ouster of Kurvitz, Rostov, and Hindpere, work on the direct sequel project Y12 continued for several months under Argo Tuulik, one of the writers on Disco Elysium, and Dora Klindžić until management cancelled it in mid-2022. Shortly thereafter, Tuulik and Klindžić were asked to pitch a "standalone expansion" to Disco Elysium, X7, later revealed to be titled Locust City: A Disco Elysium Story, which centered on the characters of Cuno and Cunoesse. The game was greenlighted by management without a pre-production period. Full production began before the understaffed writing duo had a full outline of the game. They gained additional staff when Kender's project P1 was cancelled pursuant to his ouster. The team produced a "well-received" internal demo for X7 at the end of 2023.

In February 2024, Sports Illustrated's gaming publication GLHF reported that ZA/UM was laying off about 25% of its staff, including Tuulik and Klindžić, cancelling X7, and confirmed the earlier cancellation of Y12. Tuulik noted that the layoffs primarily targeted women and team members who had raised complaints about working conditions. PC Gamer reported that the only remaining projects at ZA/UM were M0, a Disco Elysium mobile game, and C4, an unrelated RPG.

== Legacy ==
The success of Disco Elysium gave rise to a subgenre of narrative-driven RPGs referred to as "Disco-likes". Disco Elysium's formula is followed by current and former members ZA/UM as well as a number of indie developers.

ZA/UM's C4 project was later revealed to be Zero Parades: For Dead Spies, an RPG with the same narrative and art style as Disco Elysium, involving a female spy convincing her former collaborators to regroup for a mission. Previews for the game identified Zero Parades as having numerous similar visual elements as Disco Elysium, including its art style and user interface. The game was released in May 2026.

The conflicts around the ZA/UM studio and breakup of the team led to four different projects from different members each seeking to be a successor to Disco Elysium, in addition to Zero Parades. After leaving ZA/UM, Kurvitz and Rostov launched Red Info in June 2022, a development studio to work on a spiritual successor to Disco Elysium. Red Info has been backed by at least $10 million in funding by NetEase and has brought writer Chris Avellone to help.

The other three spiritual successor projects were announced nearly simultaneously in October 2024 by three separate studios, each with some former members of ZA/UM.

- Longdue includes Martin Luiga—formerly of Red Info—plus Disco Elysium narrator Lenval Brown and other developers from Bungie and Rockstar Games. Longdue announced their game Hopetown was funded via a Kickstarter campaign in April 2025.
- Dark Math Games was founded by investor Linnamae, and includes Kender and other ZA/UM developers. Dark Math is developing Tangerine Antarctic (previously named XXX Nightshift). Tangerine Antarctic is set in a fictional ski resort located at Mount Hope in Antarctica, with "Tangerine Antarctic" the name of the hotel for the resort, and where the characters must solve a murder mystery among the guests that are stuck at the hotel due to a snowstorm. Unlike Disco Elysium's isometric view, the game will be played by a third-person camera.
- Summer Eternal was founded by writers Argo Tuulik and Dora Klindžić. Both had worked previously with Dark Math and Longdue, but left these studios due to internal conflicts. Summer Eternal later brought on Olga Moskvina and other senior developers from ZA/UM. In October 2026, they announced their Disco-like game in making – Red Rooster.

Disco Elysium's non-traditional approach to a role-playing game has inspired at least one developer to follow a similar path for Esoteric Ebb. The game was inspired by both Disco Elysium and Planescape: Torment, taking place in a more traditional fantasy setting, and like Disco Elysium does not have direct combat but instead skill checks made against the player-character's various internal voices representing different character attributes.
