= Thomas Watters =

Thomas Watters (9 February 1840 – 10 January 1901) was an Oriental scholar.

== Life ==
Thomas Watters was born on 9 February 1840 in Newtownards, in County Down, Ireland. He was home schooled by his father, the Rev. Thomas Watters, the Presbyterian Minister in Newtownards. He entered Queen's College, Belfast in 1857 and graduated with a B.A. from Queen's University in 1861 and an M.A. in 1861.

He was appointed to a post in the Consular Service of China in 1863 going first to Beijing. He was then posted in 1887-1888 as Acting Consul General in Korea, in Guangzhou 1891-1893 and then until April, 1895, Consul in Fuzhou, when failing health forced him to retire after 32 years' service in the Far East.

== Partial list of works ==
- A Guide to the Tablets in a Temple of Confucius, by T. Watters, H. M.'s Consul for Wuhu. Shanghai, China: - Printed at the American Presbyterian Mission Press, 1879, in-8, pp. xx-259.
- Lao-Tzû 老子. A Study in Chinese Philosophy, by T. Watters, M. A.. Hong Kong: Printed at the "China Mail" Office, 1870, in-8, pp. 114 without the preface. A Large part of this work appeared previously in The Chinese Recorder and Missionary Journal, Vol. I, pp. 31, 57, 82, 106, 128, 164, 209. In his brochure, M. Watters has added two chapters (VIII, Lao Tzû, and Confucius; IX, Conclusion).
- "Buddhism in China." By T. Watters. (Chinese Recorder, II, pp. 16, 38-43, 64-8, 81-8, 117, 145-150.)
- "Notes on the "Miao-fa-lien-hua-ching, a Buddhist Sutra in Chinese", by T. Watters. (Journal North-China Br. B. As. Soc., N. S., No. IX, 1874, Art. IV, p. 89.)
- "Fa-Hsien and his English Translators." T. Watters. China Review. 1879-1880. In several sections.
- "The A-mi-t'ê ching." (1882). By T. Watters. (China Review, X, pp. 225–240.)
- The Ta-yun-lun-ch'ing-yü-ching. (1882) 大雲輪请雨經 By T. Watters. (China Review, X, pp. 384–395).
- "The Eighteen Lohan of Chinese Buddhist Temples." By T. Watters. (Jour. Roy. As. Soc., April 1898, pp. 329–347).
- "Kapilavastu in the Buddhist Books." By T. Watters. (Ibid., July 1898, pp. 533–571).
- "Notes on Chinese Mahometan Literature." By T. Watters. (China Review, I, pp. 195–199.)
- "The Life and Works of Han Yü or Han Wên-kung. By T. Watters. (Journal N. C. Br. R. As. Soc., for 1871 and 1872, N. S., VII, pp. 165-181).
- TAO 道: “An Essay on a Word." By T. Watters. (Chinese Recorder, IV, pp. 1–4, 33-5, 100-2).
- "Essays on the Chinese Language." By T. Watters. (China Review, IV, 1889, pp. 207–212, 271-8, 335-343. - V, pp. 9–13, 75-83, 145-152, 208-216.)
- "Chinese Notions about Pigeons and Doves." By T. Watters. (Journ. N. C. Br. R. As. Soc., IV, Dec. 1867, pp. 225 et seq.)
- "Chinese Fox-Myths." By T. Watters. (Journ. N. C. Br. R. As. Soc., N. S., VIII, 1873, pp. 45 et seq.)
- Stories of Everyday Life in Modern China. Told by (Chinese and Done into English by T. Watters, late H. M. Consul at Foochow. London, David Nutt, 1896.
- On Yuan Chwang’s Travels in India. Thomas Watters (1904–05) London, Royal Asiatic Society. Reprint, Delhi, Munshiram Manoharlal, 1973.
