= ZA/UM =

Video game company

- ZA/UM logo
- Type: Private
- Industry: Video games
- Founded: 2015; 11 years ago
- Founders: Robert Kurvitz; Kaur Kender
- Headquarters: United Kingdom
- Products: Disco Elysium; Zero Parades: For Dead Spies
- Website: zaumstudio.com

ZA/UM is an independent video game developer and publisher, and former cultural association, based in the United Kingdom. Originally a cultural collective founded in 2009, ZA/UM was registered as a company in 2015 by novelists Robert Kurvitz and Kaur Kender in Estonia, and has offices in London and Brighton.

ZA/UM's first game, Disco Elysium, was released for Windows in October 2019 and macOS in April 2020. An expanded version of the game featuring full voice acting and new content, titled The Final Cut, was released for consoles in 2021, alongside a free update for the PC versions. ZA/UM Atelier was launched in March 2021, featuring limited edition clothing and artwork inspired by concepts from the game.

Following the release of Disco Elysium, several key contributors to ZA/UM, including founders Kurvitz and Kender left the organisation in acrimony, resulting in legal disputes. Several games the studio had in development were then cancelled, and 25% of the workforce laid off. In 2026, the studio's second game, Zero Parades: For Dead Spies, was released. Although critically well-received, it sold poorly, resulting in a further round of layoffs.

== Background as a cultural association ==
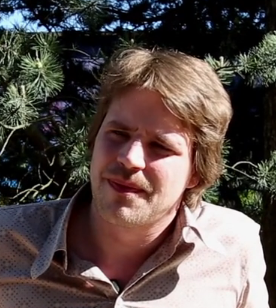
Founder, novelist Robert Kurvitz pictured in 2014

=== Formation ===
The core of what would become the ZA/UM collective was a group of high-school dropouts who called themselves The Overcoats in Tallinn, Estonia. They would engage in long pen-and-paper role-playing game sessions that would form the basis of the world of Disco Elysium. The group also wrote provocative prose on a blog they called NIHILIST.FM, which proved to be popular.

In 2005, Kurvitz was playing in a band called Ultramelanhool and conceived of a fictional world during a drunken evening while listening to Tiësto's "Adagio for Strings". The group then created a collective of artists and musicians called ZA/UM in 2009. The group was founded by Robert Kurvitz, Martin Luiga, Jüri Saks, Aleksander Rostov and Joanna Ellmann. The name "za um", is a reference to the Zaum constructed language created by Russian avant-garde poets in the early 1900s. Its name can be read in Russian as a shortcut for the idiom взяться за ум (vzyat'sya za um), which is similar to the English idea of bootstrapping. The use of all-capitals and the slash symbol is to present the team as "something that definitely exists and weighs eight tonnes".

=== Sacred and Terrible Air and Kurvitz-Kender relationship ===
During this period, Kurvitz met Estonian author Kaur Kender, who helped him to write a novel set in this world, Sacred and Terrible Air, which was published in 2013 but only sold about one thousand copies. Kurvitz fell into a period of depression and alcoholism for about three years following the book's commercial failure. The failure of Sacred and Terrible Air, along with Kurvitz and Rostov's teenage experience with Dungeons and Dragons, would inspire ZA/UM's design philosophy of embracing failure.

In 2013, Kender was made the acting editor-in-chief for the cultural newspaper Sirp after a failed contest to fill the role and a round of layoffs. Kender recruited Kurvitz as an editor for this endeavour, but the two were accused of copyright infringement for publishing an unpublished work by poet Andres Aule, and resigned on November 25. The cultural minister Rein Lang also resigned for allegedly interfering with the magazine through his support for Kender. Kurvitz would later describe his experience with the national cultural magazine as a "clownish disaster" that turned the group from being "completely ignored" to being the "dark joke of the year".

Kurvitz eventually managed to overcome his alcoholism and helped Kender in his own recovery. As a sign of gratitude, Kender suggested to Kurvitz that instead of pursuing a novel, he could try capturing his world as a video game to draw a larger interest. Kurvitz had no experience in video games, but once he saw the artwork of the game's setting easily fitting into an isometric format, as well as Rostov's agreement that they might as well continue taking the risk of failing on a video game together, Kurvitz proceeded with the idea. They registered ZA/UM as a company in 2015 to develop the game.

== Disco Elysium ==
=== Development and move of ZA/UM to the UK ===
Work on Disco Elysium started around 2016, with the local team living in a squat in a former gallery in Tallinn. They were able to secure venture capital into the game during the first year, which allowed Kurvitz to seek out the English band British Sea Power for music for the game's soundtrack. While in Birmingham to speak to the band, Kurvitz realised England was a better location for the main development team as there were more local resources for both development and for voice-overs. During development, some of the staff relocated from Estonia to London and Brighton, with other designers working out of Poland, Romania, and China. Overall, by the time of the game's release, ZA/UM had about 20 outside consultants and 35 in-house developers, with a team of eight writers assisting Kurvitz in the game's dialogue. The majority of the game's funding was provided by Estonian businessman Margus Linnamäe.

=== Expansion of scope and delay ===
As originally planned, the game was to focus on action in a single city location to make the 2017 release. However, as ZA/UM had indicated to investors that this was to be a game that spanned a larger world, they found the need to spread beyond that single location, forcing them to delay the game's release, along with the name change to Disco Elysium. Kurvitz had always anticipated the No Truce title to be more of a working title and wanted to reserve it for when they had bundled Disco Elysium with a second planned game. Though ZA/UM had initially planned to publish the game through Humble Bundle, they ultimately chose to self-publish it.

=== Release and reception ===
Disco Elysium received universal critical acclaim upon its release, winning numerous awards, notably at the Game Awards 2019 (Best Independent Game, Best Narrative, Best Role Playing Game, Fresh Indie Game). It sold more than five million copies, and is regarded by some critics as one of the greatest video games of all time, and a strong example of video games as an art form.

== Breakup of ZA/UM ==
Following the critical and commercial success of Disco Elysium, work immediately began on a direct sequel to the game as well as several spin-off projects. The direct sequel, code-named Y12, was led by Kurvitz, Rostov, and Hindpere. Another project, P1, was led by Kender.

=== Departures of Kurvitz and key members ===
In October 2022, ZA/UM member Martin Luiga announced that he, Kurvitz, Rostov, and Hindpere of ZA/UM had "involuntarily left the company" in late 2021, stating that ZA/UM "no longer represents the ethos it was founded on." Luiga also affirmed that the ZA/UM cultural association had also been dissolved. In an interview, Luiga stated that the other three members had been fired under false pretenses. A spokesperson for ZA/UM denied the allegations.

In early November 2022, conflicting reports of the events were announced. According to Kurvitz, Zaum Studio OÜ, the development studio, was originally owned in majority shares by Margus Linnamäe, and was then acquired by Tütreke OÜ, a holding company owned by studio CEO Ilmar Kompus through a share purchase in 2021. Kurvitz and Rostov claimed that the funds used for that purchase were pulled from the studio itself, making it a fraudulent purchase, upon which they started to challenge the purchase and recover their IP from the studio. Among Kurvitz' and Rostov's complaints is that Kompus purchased four sketches from ZA/UM that were establishing the basis for a Disco Elysium sequel for £1, then resold these to Zaum for €4.8 million, effectively helping Kompus regain part of the money spent to acquire ZA/UM through Tütreke.

Kurvitz and Rostov discovered the change in how the company was organised, including their demotion, and were fired when they began raising questions. Kurvitz and Rostov argued that they still have some control of the Disco Elysium intellectual property rights, and thus should have had a say in blocking the sale. ZA/UM denied the charges in a statement, and alleged that the former employees had been let go for creating a disruptive environment at the studio, claiming that the two had "limited to no engagement in their responsibility and work", as well as verbally abused and discriminated against other employees. Other employees of ZA/UM, speaking anonymously with GamesIndustry.biz, claimed the situation was "not black and white".

=== Legal disputes ===
Legal proceedings in the matter were started by Kaur Kender, the executive producer of Disco Elysium. Kender had asked similar questions of the change in ZA/UM's management, leading to his firing. He filed suit asserting that Kompus owed him €1 million. Kender further asserted that Kompus was aided by Tõnis Haavel, an Estonian investor and Kompus' brother-in-law who had been convicted of fraud and was already €11.5 million in debt. Haavel has a majority share in Yessirnosir Ltd., a United Kingdom subsidiary of ZA/UM where the Disco Elysium rights are held. An initial hearing in Kender's case, which included statements from Kurvitz, was held in October 2022. By December 2022, Kender had dropped his lawsuit, as Kompus had paid back €4.8 million from Tütreke back to ZA/UM. Kurvitz and Rostov still assert that there were illegal actions to take over the development studio leading to their ouster.

The studio issued a statement on 14 March 2023 stating that all legal actions from the former members were concluded. Of Kender, he had "divested all his shares in the studio, repaid all his debts to the studio", and paid for the studio's legal fees under court order. Of Kurvitz and Rostov, the studio alleged that their lawsuit was dropped due to a lack of evidence. Further details of these cases remain confidential. On 17 March 2023, Kurvitz and Rostov responded to this statement by clarifying that the announcement was "wrong and misleading in several respects" and "[sought] to unfairly paint [them] - the remaining minority shareholders in ZA/UM - as mere disgruntled employees." Kurvitz and Rostov also stated that their lawsuit regarding employment claims against the studio was dismissed "as part of a larger campaign against [them]" and that they plan to "pursue legal options accordingly." In May 2023, People Make Games published the findings of their investigation into ZA/UM's legal situation, in which Tuulik was featured heavily in interviews. Klindžić alleged that company executives isolated Tuulik in retaliation for unfavorable comments made toward them in the documentary.

=== Abortive projects ===
Following the ouster of Kurvitz, Rostov, and Hindpere, work on the direct sequel project Y12 continued for several months under Argo Tuulik, one of the writers on Disco Elysium, and Dora Klindžić until management cancelled it in mid-2022. Shortly thereafter, Tuulik and Klindžić were asked to pitch a "standalone expansion" to Disco Elysium, X7, later revealed to be titled Locust City: A Disco Elysium Story, which centered on the characters of Cuno and Cunoesse. The game was greenlighted by management without a pre-production period. Full production began before the understaffed writing duo had a full outline of the game. They gained additional staff when Kender's project P1 was cancelled pursuant to his ouster. The team produced a "well-received" internal demo for X7 at the end of 2023.

In February 2024, Sports Illustrated's gaming publication GLHF reported that ZA/UM was laying off about 25% of its staff, including Tuulik and Klindžić, cancelling X7, and confirmed the earlier cancellation of Y12. Tuulik noted that the layoffs primarily targeted women and team members who had raised complaints about working conditions. PC Gamer reported that the only remaining projects at ZA/UM were M0, a Disco Elysium mobile game, and C4, an unrelated RPG. In March 2025, ZA/UM revealed C4 as Zero Parades, not connected in story or setting with Disco Elysium, nor considered as a spiritual successor.

=== Splinter studios ===
The conflicts around the ZA/UM studio and breakup of the team led to four different projects from different members each seeking to be a successor to Disco Elysium, in addition to ZA/UM's own Zero Parades. After leaving ZA/UM, Kurvitz and Rostov launched Red Info in June 2022, a development studio to work on a spiritual successor to Disco Elysium. Red Info has been backed by at least $10 million in funding by NetEase and has brought writer Chris Avellone to help.

Three other spiritual successor projects were announced nearly simultaneously in October 2024 by three separate studios, each with some former members of ZA/UM.

- Longdue includes Martin Luiga—formerly of Red Info—plus Disco Elysium narrator Lenval Brown and other developers from Bungie and Rockstar Games. Longdue announced their game Hopetown was funded via a Kickstarter campaign in April 2025.
- Dark Math Games was founded by investor Linnamae, and includes Kender and other ZA/UM developers. Dark Math is developing Tangerine Antarctic (previously named XXX Nightshift).
- Summer Eternal was founded by writers Argo Tuulik and Dora Klindžić. Both had worked previously with Dark Math and Longdue, but left these studios due to internal conflicts. Summer Eternal later brought on Olga Moskvina and other senior developers from ZA/UM. In October 2026, they announced their Disco-like game in making – Red Rooster.

== Zero Parades ==
In 2026, the studio's second game, Zero Parades: For Dead Spies, was released on Windows and Playstation 5. Like Disco Elysium, it was a single-player role playing game in isometric view. It was set in a new universe of Portofiro, with communist, neoliberal and fascist factions. Writers Siim "Kosmos" Sinamäe and Honey Watson said that unlike Disco Elysium which was a cop story, Zero Parades is a spy story, where there is necessarily no right or wrong action, making the game more suitable to the systems they had developed for it. Zero Parades was inspired primarily by the spy novels of John le Carré, which Watson said were more intellectual compared to James Bond, and about a person doing "sneaky, horrible things" as part of their espionage, and allows the player to opt to role-play more directly with Hershel. Additionally, the works of Ursula K. Le Guin and Thomas Pynchon inspired the story.

It was critically well-received, attracting praise for its writing, and criticism for being derivative of Disco Elysium. The game's sales were below expectations, however, and in July 2026, ZA/UM announced a round of layoffs and redundancies, with 32 staff from across the studio released.
