= Robert Kurvitz =

Estonian novelist, musician, and game designer

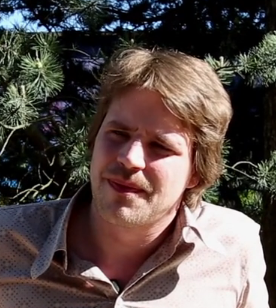
- Kurvitz in 2014
- Born: 8 October 1984 (age 41); Tallinn, then part of Estonian SSR, Soviet Union
- Occupations: Novelist; video game designer
- Writing career
- Period: 2000s–present
- Genres: Speculative fiction; Magical realism
- Notable works: Sacred and Terrible Air; Disco Elysium

Robert Kurvitz (born 8 October 1984) is an Estonian novelist, video game designer, and musician. He was the lead writer and designer of the 2019 video game Disco Elysium as a founding member of the ZA/UM cultural association and the eponymous video game development company that emerged from it. Kurvitz was fired from ZA/UM in 2022 after conflicts arose with investors who had acquired a majority stake in the company.

== Life and career ==
=== Early life ===
Kurvitz was born in Tallinn on 8 October 1984 to the artist couple Raoul Kurvitz and Lilian Mosolainen. By the age of fifteen, Kurvitz had dropped out of school. He became part of a group of peers called The Overcoats, a group of "5-10 high school dropouts...anarchists of some sort, with the motto: 'Today we drink tea, tomorrow we rule the world.'"

Long pen-and-paper role-playing sessions with this group were the beginning of the world that would become Disco Elysium's Elysium, and former Overcoats would form the core of the group that coalesced into the ZA/UM cultural association (not to be confused with ZA/UM Studio) in the late 2000s. The collective would later be described by The New York Times as a group of "leftist writers and artists who gathered in Tallinn".

It was in this constellation that Kurvitz and some of the other artists began playing tabletop role-playing campaigns in a universe created and expanded over the years by Kurvitz himself. This universe called Elysium was characterized by steampunk elements, political turmoil and influenced by the participants' childhoods in the Eastern Bloc. It would be the setting of many ZA/UM projects, most notably Kurvitz 2013 novel Sacred and Terrible Air and the 2019 CRPG Disco Elysium.

=== Music ===
In 2001, Kurvitz became the lyricist and lead singer of progressive rock band Ultramelanhool, which has seen by many as a continuation of the Estonian alternative rock tradition developed by Vennaskond and Metro Luminal. The literary scientist Jaak Tomberg argued, however, that such easy comparisons may do a disservice to the band's actual original character. To date, they have released two albums, Must apelsin (Black Orange) and Materjal (Material), in 2004 and 2008 respectively.

The band failed to secure an Estonian record label for their second album. It was then self-released with money inherited by Kurvitz's long-time friend, editor, and collaborator Martin Luiga, and released on the internet for free. In 2011, Kurvitz collaborated on his father Raoul's album Forbidden to Sing, providing backing vocals and keyboards.

=== Literature ===
In 2013, Kurvitz published the novel Sacred and Terrible Air (Estonian: Püha ja õudne lõhn), on which he had worked over five years. The novel, set in the fictional world of Elysium, centers on three men who, twenty years after the unexplained disappearance of their classmates, are still determined to locate them. It received positive reviews, with literary theorist Johanna Ross highlighting it as one of the few books to successfully bridge science fiction and "literature proper".

Literary scientist Jaak Tomberg emphasized the great attention to detail in his review: "Through that novel we bear witness to (1) a style which seems to be in its actually realistic and simply reflective way to be attentive towards the world to an almost paranoid degree, and (2) to a made-up world, which in its relentless interconnectedness is far more systemic than the reality we recognize as 'our own' and also remarkably more systemic than most of the fictional ones, which may by their similar way of building reservedly be called 'fantastic'." Despite its positive critical reception, the book was a commercial failure, selling between 1,000 and 1,500 copies, and causing Kurvitz to "succumb to a deep alcoholism". An English translation was planned for 2020, but it did not occur. As of 2023, two English fan translations exist.

Having played tabletop roleplaying games for much of his life, Kurvitz uses worldbuilding techniques derived from Dungeons & Dragons, though opting for a pseudo-modernist fantasy world instead of a pseudo-medieval one. He employs help in the development of his ideas. "Mass editing" was employed as a tool in the finishing stage of the book; people of varying backgrounds assessed the readability and realism of the work, pointing out confusing passages and suggesting amendments.

=== Video games ===
After years of leading tabletop campaigns and expanding their own setting, the world of Elysium, the idea was brought up to develop a game set in this world. In 2015 Kurvitz started to recruit members of the ZA/UM cultural association and the following year he founded the video game development company ZA/UM. After a five year development cycle the single-player computer roleplaying game titled Disco Elysium, was released on 15 October 2019. Kurvitz was the game's lead writer and designer, having produced about half of the total in-game text (half a million words). It received universal acclaim, being named as a game of the year by several publications, along with numerous other awards for its narrative and art.

Kurvitz claims to have developed the Elysium world since he was fifteen or sixteen, originally inspired by "a bootleg Finnish Middle Earth roleplay system". The game is also notable for having far less emphasis on violence than the norm for the RPG genre. Kurvitz considers some aspects of Disco Elysium "essentially Soviet", referencing the Soviet Union's tradition of science fiction literature and the works of the Strugatsky brothers in particular. "They were people who took responsibility for the heat death of the universe. When they were writing books, this needed to contribute to the ultimate fate of the universe. Because they didn't have money obligations, so what are your obligations then? So this kind of serious responsibility for, what the fuck does a piece of entertainment really do to the human mind, and what are the responsibilities therein, that I think is very, very, very prevalent in Disco Elysium."

Disco Elysium: The Final Cut, an expanded version of the game, was released in 2021 and work on its sequel, code-named 'Y12', was underway at this point, as was reported later, but was cut short by the involuntary departure of Kurvitz, art director Aleksander Rostov and Final Cut lead writer Helen Hindpere from ZA/UM. The project was eventually shelved by the company, following a lack of direction without many of the original game's senior developers.

==== Red Info ====
In 2025 it was reported by the Financial Times that Kurvitz, Rostov and Hindpere have founded another game studio called Red Info where they are working on a new project together with American game developer Chris Avellone, who was the lead writer on 1999's Planescape: Torment, a central influence on Disco Elysium. They have secured a $10 million investment by the Chinese tech company NetEase.

=== Politics ===
A communist, Kurvitz has a green-gold bust of Russian revolutionary Vladimir Lenin on his writing desk, which he claimed formerly belonged to Estonian Soviet writer Juhan Smuul. "I guess my favourite thing I like to say about this is that for me it's just a wholesome tradition. It's about loyalty, it's about the country where I was born. This is how I was raised, this was who I was told to follow, and I would be a naughty revolutionary, kind of an edgy rebel, if I wouldn't have Lenin on my writing desk." Kurvitz is a follower of Hegelian dialectics, which he describes as "the central principle of Elysium's worldbuilding." Dialectics and other leftist historical theories were essential for Elysium's development, forming the basis for critical elements of the world's history, such as the innocentic system.

== Legal issues and controversies ==
=== 2013 Sirp controversy ===
In November 2013, Kaur Kender, Kurvitz's longtime friend and collaborator on A Sacred and Terrible Air, was announced as editor-in-chief of the Estonian cultural magazine Sirp. Kender soon brought Kurvitz on as an editor. Kender's appointment was criticized by many in the press and some artists for their "undemocratic" nature on the part of the Ministry of Culture, though these protests were also criticized for exaggerating the problem.

Less than a month later, both Kender and Kurvitz announced their resignations from the magazine after they published an unpublished work by poet Andres Aule, which was done without his consent. In their statement, they said that they had made "a grave mistake" and "[did] not see the possibility of continuing." In the Disco Elysium official artbook, Kurvitz described the situation as "a suicidal manoeuvre that constituted the pathetic crescendo of our national careers, an unremovable stain, an unforgivable sin."

=== Removal from ZA/UM ===
In October 2022, Kurvitz, along with art director Aleksander Rostov and writer Helen Hindpere of ZA/UM, were announced by member Martin Luiga in a Medium post to have, along with Luiga himself, "involuntarily left the company", stating that ZA/UM "no longer represents the ethos it was founded on." Luiga also revealed that the original ZA/UM cultural association had been dissolved. In an interview, Luiga stated that Kurvitz and the other members had been fired under false premises. A ZA/UM spokesperson stated to Eurogamer that "Like any video game, the development of Disco Elysium was and still is a collective effort, with every team member's contribution essential and valued as part of a greater whole. At this time, we have no further comment to make other than the ZA/UM creative team's focus remains on the development of our next project, and we are excited to share more news on this with you all soon."

Additional statements were released by the conflicting parties in early November 2022. Kurvitz and Rostov together claimed that Zaum Studio OÜ, the development studio, was originally owned in majority shares by Margus Linnamäe and was then acquired by Tütreke OÜ, a holding company owned by studio CEO Ilmar Kompus through a share purchase in 2021. Kurvitz and Rostov claimed that the funds used for that purchase were pulled from the studio itself, making it a fraudulent purchase; on this basis they sought to challenge the purchase and recover their IP from the studio. The pair alleged that Kompus purchased four sketches from Zaum that were establishing the basis for a Disco Elysium sequel for £1, then resold these to Zaum for €4.8 million, effectively helping Kompus regain part of the money spent to acquire Zaum through Tütreke.

Kurvitz and Rostov discovered the change in how the company was organized, including their demotion, and alleged that they were fired when they began asking questions. Kurvitz and Rostov argued that they still have some control of the Disco Elysium intellectual property rights, and thus should have had a say in blocking the sale. Zaum Studio released a statement dismissing the charges, saying that the former employees had been let go for creating a disruptive environment at the studio, that the two had "limited to no engagement in their responsibility and work", and that they had verbally abused and engaged in gender discrimination against other employees.

Other employees of Zaum Studio speaking anonymously with GamesIndustry.biz claimed the situation lay between these points. A later investigation by People Make Games corroborated some of the studio's accusations, with Kurvitz in particular singled out by some other employees, who assumed lead roles subsequent to his ousting, for poor management and creating a hostile work environment, especially during Disco Elysium's long period of crunch.

Legal proceedings in the matter were started by Kaur Kender, the executive producer of Disco Elysium and Kurvitz's longtime friend and collaborator. An initial hearing in Kender's case, which included statements from Kurvitz, was held in October 2022. By December 2022, Kender had dropped his lawsuit, as Kompus had paid back €4.8 million from Tütreke back to ZA/UM. Kurvitz and Rostov still assert that there were illegal actions to take over the development studio leading to their ouster.

The studio issued a statement on 14 March 2023 stating that all legal actions from the former members were concluded. The studio alleged that Kurvitz and Rostov's lawsuit was dropped due to a lack of evidence. Further details of these cases remain confidential. However, on 17 March 2023, Kurvitz and another former ZA/UM creative, Sander Taal (the real legal name of Rostov, according to ZA/UM), responded to this statement by clarifying that the announcement was "wrong and misleading in several respects" and "[sought] to unfairly paint [them] - the remaining minority shareholders in ZA/UM - as mere disgruntled employees." Kurvitz and Taal also stated that their lawsuit regarding employment claims against the studio was dismissed "as part of a larger campaign against [them]" and that they plan to "pursue legal options accordingly." This statement additionally makes clear a rift between Kurvitz and his longtime collaborator Kender, stating "Unlike Kender, we [Kurvitz and Taal] have not participated in the looting of ZA/UM".
