= Ludovico =

- Gender: Male

Origin
- Origin: German name Ludwig
- Meaning: Famous fighter
- Region of origin: Italy

Other names
- Variant form: Lodovico Ludovica
- Related names: Alois, Clovis, Lewis, Louis, Ludovic, Ludvík, Ludwig, Luis

Ludovico (Italian pronunciation: [ludoˈviːko]) is an Italian masculine given name. It is sometimes spelled Lodovico. The feminine equivalent is Ludovica.

== Persons with the name Ludovico ==
=== Given name ===
- Ludovico D'Aragona (1876–1961), Italian socialist politician
- Ludovico Agostini (1536–1609), Italian poet
- Ludovico Ariosto (1474–1533), Italian poet
- Ludovico Avio (1932–1996), Argentine football forward
- Ludovico Baille (1764–1839), Italian historian
- Ludovico Balbi (1540–1604), Italian composer
- Ludovico Barassi (1873–1953), Italian jurist
- Ludovico Barbo (1381–1443), Italian monastic life reformer
- Ludovico Bertonio (1552–1625), Italian Jesuit missionary
- Ludovico Bidoglio (1900–1970), Argentinian footballer
- Ludovico Brea (c. 1450–c. 1523), Italian painter
- Ludovico di Breme (1780–1820), Italian writer
- Ludovico Ottavio Burnacini (1636–1707), Italian architect and stage designer
- Ludovico Buti (c. 1560–after 1611), Italian painter
- Ludovico Camangi (1903–1976), Italian politician
- Lodovico Campalastro, Italian painter
- Ludovico di Caporiacco (1901–1951), Italian arachnologist
- Ludovico Carracci (1555–1619), Italian painter, etcher, and printmaker
- Ludovico of Casoria (1814–1885), Italian Franciscan friar
- Ludovico Cavaleri (1867–1942), Italian painter
- Ludovico Chigi Albani della Rovere (1866–1951), Grand Master of the Sovereign Military Order of Malta
- Ludovico Costa (fl. 1648–1657), Italian painter
- Ludovico David (born 1648), Italian painter
- Ludovico Donato (died c. 1385), Italian cardinal
- Ludovico Einaudi (born 1955), Italian pianist and composer
- Ludovico Fremont (1982), Italian actor
- Ludovico Furconio, Roman Catholic prelate who served as Bishop of Giovinazzo (1528–1549)
- Ludovico de Filippi (1872–1918), Italian naval officer and a pioneer of Italian aviation
- Ludovico Geymonat (1908–1991), Italian Marxist philosopher
- Ludovico Giamagna (1594–1634), Roman Catholic prelate who served as Bishop of Ston
- Ludovico Gimignani (1643–1697), Italian painter
- Ludovico Gonzaga (disambiguation), multiple people, including:
  - Ludovico I Gonzaga (1268–1360), better known as Luigi, the first Capitano del Popolo of Mantua and Imperial Vicar
  - Ludovico II Gonzaga (1334–1382), Italian politician who was Capitano del Popolo of Mantua
  - Ludovico III Gonzaga (1412–1478), ruler of Mantua, Italy
  - Ludovico Gonzaga (1480–1540) (c. 1480–1540), Italian nobleman and condottiero
- Ludovico Gonzaga-Nevers, (1539–1595), Duke of Nevers from 1565
- Ludovico Lana (c. 1597–1646), Italian painter
- Ludovico Lipparini (1800–1856), Italian painter
- Ludovico Ludovisi (1595–1632), Italian cardinal and statesman
- Ludovico de Luigi (born 1933), Italian sculptor and painter
- Ludovico Madruzzo (1532–1600), Italian cardinal and statesman
- Ludovico Manin (1725–1802), Doge of Venice
- Ludovico Mazzanti (1686–1775), Italian painter
- Ludovico Mazzolino (1480–c. 1528), Italian painter
- Ludovico Micara (1775–1847), Italian cardinal
- Ludovico Moresi (born 1980), Italian footballer
- Ludovico Antonio Muratori (1672–1750), Italian historian
- Ludovico Nitoglia (born 1983), Italian rugby union player
- Ludovico Pasquali, (c. 1500–1551), Italian writer
- Ludovico Prodocator (died 1504), Italian cardinal
- Ludovico Racaniello (1352–1441), Italian condottiero
- Lodovico Rocca (1895–1986), Italian composer
- Ludovico Roncalli (1654–1713), Italian nobleman and composer
- Ludovico Rusconi Sassi (1678–1736), Italian architect
- Ludovico Sabbatini (1650–1724), Italian priest and religious educator
- Ludovico I of Saluzzo (c. 1416–1475), marquess of Saluzzo
- Ludovico II of Saluzzo (1438–1504), Count of Carmagnola and marquess of Saluzzo
- Ludovico Scarfiotti (1933–1968), Italian sports car driver
- Ludovico Sforza (1452–1508), member of the Sforza dynasty of the Duchy of Milan
- Ludovico Maria Sinistrari (1622–1701), Italian Franciscan priest and author
- Ludovico Tommasi (1866–1941), Italian painter
- Ludovico de Torres (disambiguation), multiple people, including:
  - Ludovico de Torres (cardinal) (1552–1609), Roman Catholic cardinal
  - Ludovico de Torres (bishop, born 1533) (1533–1583), Roman Catholic archbishop
- Ludovico Trasi (1634–1694), Italian painter
- Ludovico Trevisan (1401–1465), Italian catholic prelate
- Ludovico Varali (born 2009), Italian footballer
- Ludovico di Varthema (c. 1470–1517), Italian traveller and writer
- Ludovico Vicentino degli Arrighi (1475–1527), papal scribe and type designer

=== Surname ===
- Alessandro Ludovico (born 1969), artist, media critic and magazine editor in chief
- Pedro Ludovico (1891–1979), founder of Goiânia, Brazil

== Other uses ==
- The fictional Ludovico technique of psychological conditioning from the novel and film A Clockwork Orange
- Ludovico Technique LLC, an art and entertainment production company
- Lodovico, Kinsman to Brabantio, cousin to Desdemona in the play Othello
- A rap album by Şanışer

== See also ==
- Lodovico
