= Racaniello =

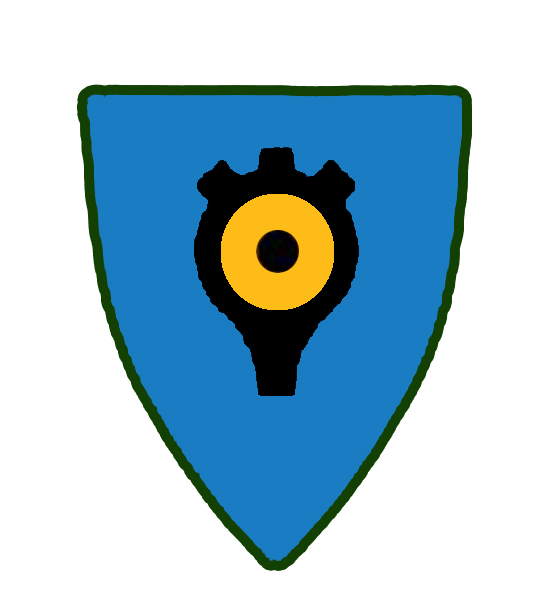
Coat of arms of the Racaniello family

The Racaniello or Racani family was a prominent family of Umbrian origin which provided a number of administrators in Todi.

One branch of the family was established in Apulia in 1412 in the service of bishop Dondei of Bari.

In 1405 another part of the family came under the protection of the Albizzi. On their behalf Ludovico Racaniello, a captain of Montecchio, today a frazione of Castiglion Fiorentino, acted as Procurator of Arezzo in 1419.

== Family coat of arms and motto ==
The coat of arms of the House of Racaniello is composed of concentric circles in yellow and scorched earth; the family motto is Dominus exquisitus artis saeviter quis revocas malum memet (I possess a refined art, that to hurt cruelly whoever does me evil).

== People named Racaniello ==
- Dave Racaniello (born 1978), baseball player
- Ludovico Racaniello (1352–1441), condottiero
- Vincent Racaniello (born 1953), virologist
