= Lodovico =

Lodovico is an Italian masculine given name, and may refer to:

- Cigoli (1559–1613), Italian painter and architect
- Lodovico, Count Corti (1823–1888), Italian diplomat
- Lodovico Agostini (1534–1590), Italian composer
- Lodovico Altieri (1805–1867), Italian cardinal
- Lodovico Balbi (1540–1604), Italian composer
- Lodovico Belluzzi (19th century), Captain Regent of San Marino
- Lodovico di Breme (1780–1820), Italian writer
- Lodovico Campalastro, Italian painter
- Lodovico Castelvetro (circa 1505–1571), Italian literary critic
- Lodovico delle Colombe (1565(?) – after 1623), Italian scholar
- Lodovico Dolce (1508–1568), Italian humanist
- Lodovico Domenichi (1515–1564), Italian humanist, translator and publisher
- Lodovico Ferrari (1522–1565), Italian mathematician
- Lodovico Filippo Laurenti (1693–1757), Italian composer
- Lodovico Fumicelli (16th century), Italian painter
- Lodovico Gallina (1752–1787), Italian painter
- Lodovico Giustini (1685–1743), Italian composer
- Lodovico Grossi da Viadana (circa 1560–1627), Italian composer
- Lodovico Guicciardini (1521–1589), Italian writer
- Lodovico Lazzarelli (1447–1500), Italian poet
- Lodovico Leoni (1531–1606), Italian painter
- Lodovico Ricci (1742–1799), Italian historian
- Lodovico Rocca (1895–1986), Italian composer
- Lodovico Trevisan (1401–1465), Italian bishop
- Lodovico Zacconi (1555–1627), Italian-Austrian composer

== See also ==
- Ludovico
