= Cristini =

Christini is an Italian surname. Notable people with the name include:

- Andrea Cristini (born 1994), Italian footballer
- Michealene Cristini Risley, American American advertiser, documentary film director and human rights activist
- Micol Cristini (born 1997), Italian figure skater
- Vittorio Cristini (1928–1974), Italian football player
