= Quintus Valerius Orca =

Quintus Valerius Orca (fl. 50s–40s BC) was a Roman praetor, a governor of the Roman province of Africa, and a commanding officer under Julius Caesar in the civil war against Pompeius Magnus and the senatorial elite. The main sources for Orca's life are letters written to him by Cicero and passages in Caesar's Bellum Civile.

== Life and career ==
Orca is generally regarded as the son of Quintus Valerius Soranus, a partisan of Gaius Marius who was executed during the Sullan proscriptions of 82 BC, allegedly for violating a religious prohibition against revealing the secret name of Rome. The family came from the municipality of Sora, near Cicero's native Arpinum. Cicero refers to the Valerii Sorani as his friends and neighbors.

Next to nothing is known of Orca's early career. As praetor in 57 BC, he actively supported Cicero's return from exile, and in 56, while governor in Africa, he was the recipient of two letters of recommendation from Cicero. Orca and Cicero had close enough relations that they had agreed upon the use of a sign or symbol to mark their correspondence as authentic and trustworthy. Orca then disappears from the historical record for several years. The length of his term in Africa is undetermined; the next known governor, P. Attius Varus, was there in 52 and probably earlier. It has been conjectured, though the dating of his governorship might argue to the contrary, that he was among those attending the conference held April 56 BC in Luca by Julius Caesar, Pompeius Magnus, and Marcus Crassus; in the company of a number of supporters the three arranged the strategic political alliance that led to the extension of Caesar's command in Gaul and the joint election of Pompey and Crassus to their second consulship.

== Role in civil war ==
During the Roman civil wars of the 40s, Valerius Orca resurfaces as one of Caesar's legates. Early in 49 BC, Orca was sent to occupy Sardinia. Caesar claims that the inhabitants of Caralis (modern Cagliari), the capital, were so roused by word of Orca's approach that on their own initiative (sua sponte) they threw out the Pompey-allied governor, who fled to Africa. The Greek historian Appian implies that part of Sardinia's strategic significance in the conflict was its importance as a center of grain production; Cassius Dio says little about the occupation of Sardinia by the Caesarians, noting merely that it was uncontested.

=== Land distribution in Volaterrae ===
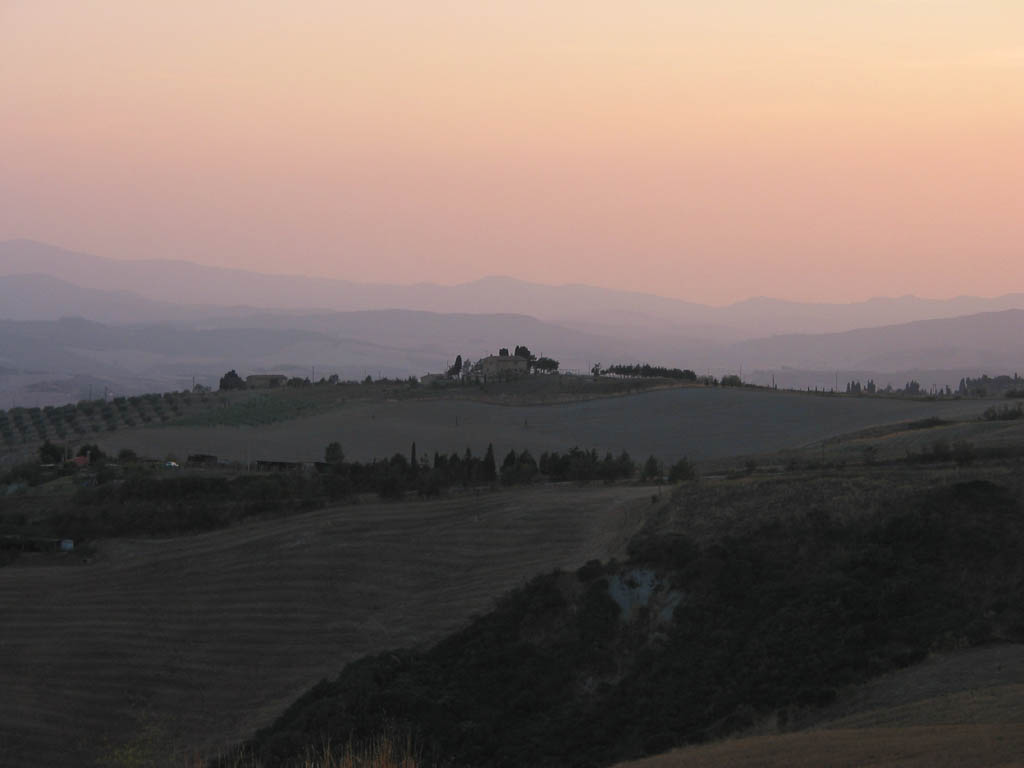
The countryside of Volterra (ancient Volaterrae)

After Caesar finally took over the dictatorship, Orca was given a commission to confiscate land in the area around Volaterrae in Etruria, which was to be redistributed to Caesar's veterans as a reward for their service. The history of these land distributions is vexed, and the degree of Orca's success is unclear. In the earlier civil war between Marius and Sulla, Volaterrae had sided with Marius, who supported greater extension of rights to Rome's allies than did the conservative Sulla. The Sullans lay siege to the town in 80 BC, and as a result of their defeat, the Volaterreans had suffered a reduction of rights and territory. This event had ended the Etruscan era for the city-state, but by 63 BC the previously confiscated lands still had not been distributed. Cicero successfully opposed this redistribution, and blocked another in 60. The issue seems to have remained unresolved for another fifteen years, until Caesar's decision to establish a colony there in 45.

Although an inscription provides evidence that Volaterrae had the legal status of colonia in the early Principate, there are few archaeological traces to indicate that veterans actually received and inhabited the land. It has been conjectured that the Volaterreans were able to negotiate a less radical reorganization from Orca, perhaps through the network of friendships, family ties and connections left from his pro-Marian father and his friend Cicero.
