= Ludovico Racaniello =

Ludovico Racaniello (1352–1441) was an Italian condottiero active in Tuscany.

== Biography ==
Ludovico was born in Todi, the first child of Riccardo, and a descendant of the Racaniello family of Umbrian origin.

He dedicated a number of years to the study of law under the direction of his father. When Riccardo died in 1378 the full weight of family responsibility fell upon the son's shoulders. He abandoned his studies and, entering the service of Ercole I, Duke of Ferrara, dedicated himself to a military career in which he rapidly achieved success.

In 1380 he married Giulia Albizzi, daughter of Maso Albizzi, thus ensuring the support of the powerful Albizzi family which in those years dominated the political life of Florence.

In 1395 Racaniello became captain of the castle of Montecchio Vesponi, near Castiglion Fiorentino, taking it from the possession of John Hawkwood. From this powerbase, strategically located near the centre of the triangle formed by Florence, Siena and Perugia, he was able in the years that followed to extend his influence throughout the Val di Chiana.

In 1397 he entered into conflict with the Casali lords of Cortona, for the possession of that town. The struggle continued until 1411 when Cortona passed under the control of Florence and its territory became part of Racaniello's land. In 1419 Racaniello was made proconsul of Arezzo by Rinaldo Albizzi.

When control of Florence passed to the Medici in 1434, Racaniello displayed skills as a diplomat that matched his skills as a condottiere. In spite of the years he had passed in the service of the family that had fought them for the control of Florence, he succeeded in ingratiating himself with the Medici to the extent that they required no adjustments to be made to the size of the territory falling under his control. Instead they recognized him as guarantor of the power of the Florentine signoria over that territory.

Ludovico Racaniello died at Montecchio in 1441.
