= San Silvestro Papa, Sora =

Church in Sora, Italy

Coordinates: 41.720622°N 13.610771°E

San Silvestro Papa is a Roman Catholic church located in the town of Sora, region of Lazio, Italy.

== History ==
According to tradition, a church at the site was commissioned by St Dominic in 1029 adjacent to a Benedictine monastery. It is dedicated to the canonized Pope Sylvester I In 1765, by then in a near ruinous state, the church was razed; and in 1770 rebuilt from the ground using designs by the architect Cristoforo de Donatis. The church has a single nave with lateral chapels. The large cupola corresponds to the octagonal dome seen from the outside. The base of the cupola has four canvases depicting the four evangelists (after 1850) by Pietro Biancale. It houses a painting of San Bernardo di Chiaravalle (1770) by Marco Caricchia; a Madonna and Child, St Sylvester Pope, and St Dominic Abbot by Paolo Antonio Sperduti; and a marble tabernacle by the Neapolitan sculptor Pecorella and designed by De Donatis. It has a terracotta depiction of the Crowned Madonna (1700).
