= Giustini =

Giustini is an Italian surname. Notable people with the surname include:

- Alessio Giustini (born 1991), Italian footballer
- Carlo Giustini (1916–2005), Italian actor
- Filippo Giustini (1852–1920), Italian cardinal
- Lodovico Giustini (1685–1743), Italian Baroque composer
