= Antonio Pompeo (politician) =

Italian politician (born 1971)

President of the Province of Frosinone
- In office 13 October 2014 – 22 December 2022
- Preceded by: Antonello Iannarilli
- Succeeded by: Luca Di Stefano

Mayor of Ferentino
- In office 28 May 2013 – 12 January 2023
- Preceded by: Piergianni Fiorletta
- Succeeded by: Piergianni Fiorletta

Personal details
- Born: 7 September 1971 (age 54) Frosinone, Lazio, Italy
- Party: Italian People's Party; The Daisy; Democratic Party
- Profession: Lawyer

Antonio Pompeo (born 7 September 1971) is an Italian lawyer and politician who served as mayor of Ferentino from 2013 to 2023 and president of the Province of Frosinone from 2014 to 2022.

== Life and career ==
Pompeo was born in Frosinone, Lazio, in 1971. He graduated in law from the Sapienza University of Rome in 1998 and began practising as a lawyer in Frosinone in 2002.

He was first elected to the Ferentino municipal council in 2001 with the Italian People's Party. He subsequently joined The Daisy, with which he was re-elected in 2003, and in 2008 was re-elected with the Democratic Party (PD). From 2003 to 2013, he also served as municipal assessor for culture, sports, entertainment and general affairs. In May 2013, Pompeo was elected mayor of Ferentino with 65.25% of the vote. He was re-elected in June 2018.

In October 2014, Pompeo was elected president of the Province of Frosinone, defeating fellow PD candidate Enrico Pittiglio, 53.79% to 46.21% (50,174 to 43,159 weighted votes). Pompeo was supported by the centre-left Democratici per Pompeo, with the backing of Francesco Scalia, as well as by Forza Italia and New Centre-Right, while Pittiglio was backed by the PD faction of Francesco De Angelis.

In October 2018, Pompeo was re-confirmed president defeating Tommaso Ciccone, the centre-right candidate, with 51,768 weighted votes (60.0%) against 34,442 (40.0%). He served until December 2022, when he was succeeded by Luca Di Stefano. Pompeo was criticized by his successor for not attending the latter's proclamation as president of the province.
