= Quintus Valerius Soranus =

Latin poet and inventor of the table of contents

Quintus Valerius Soranus (born between c. 140–130 BC, died 82 BC) was a Latin poet, grammarian, and tribune of the people in the Late Roman Republic. He was executed in 82 BC while Sulla was dictator, ostensibly for violating a religious prohibition against speaking the arcane name of Rome, but more likely for political reasons. The cognomen Soranus is a toponym indicating that he was from Sora.

A single elegiac couplet survives more or less intact from his body of work. The two lines address Jupiter as an all-powerful begetter who is both male and female. This androgynous, unitarian conception of deity, possibly an attempt to integrate Stoic and Orphic doctrine, has made the fragment of interest in religious studies.

Valerius Soranus is also credited with a little-recognized literary innovation: Pliny the Elder says he was the first writer to provide a table of contents to help readers navigate a long work.

== Life and political career ==
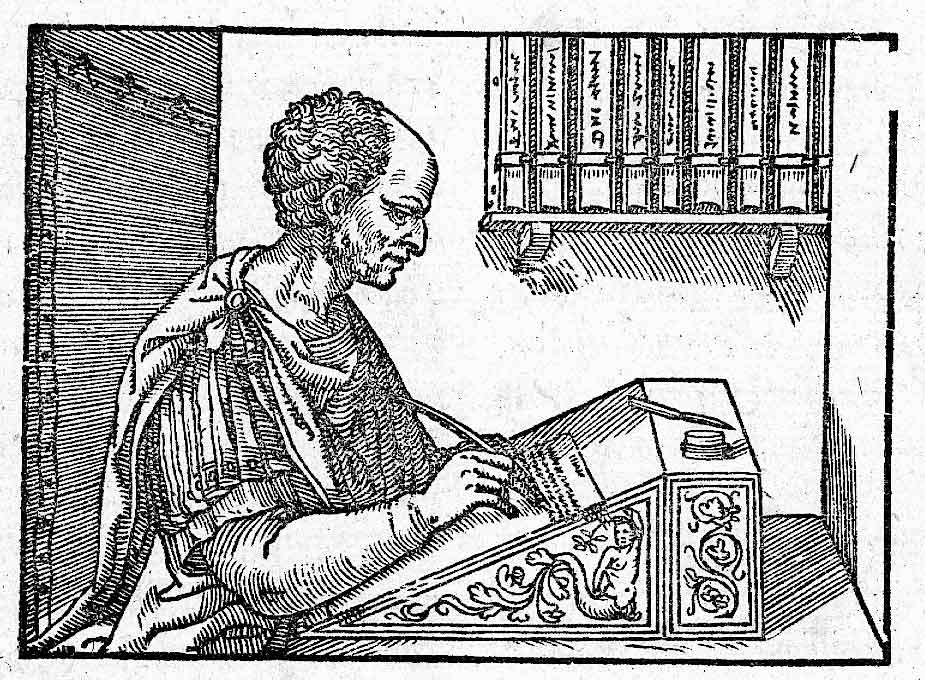
Valerius Soranus was admired for his learning by Cicero (depicted anachronistically in a 16th-century edition of his letters)

Cicero has an interlocutor in his De oratore praise Valerius Soranus as "most cultured of all who wear the toga", and Cicero lists him and his brother Decimus among an educated elite of socii et Latini; that is, those who came from allied polities on the Italian Peninsula rather than from Rome, and those whose legal status was defined by Latin right rather than full Roman citizenship. The municipality of Sora was near Cicero's native Arpinum, and he refers to the Valerii Sorani as his friends and neighbors. Soranus was also a friend of Varro and is mentioned more than once in that scholar's multi-volume work on the Latin language.

The son of Q. Valerius Soranus is thought to have been the Quintus Valerius Orca who was praetor in 57 BC. Orca had worked for Cicero's return to public life and is among Cicero's correspondents in the Epistulae ad familiares (Letters to Friends and Family).

Cicero presents the Valerii brothers of Sora as well schooled in Greek and Latin literature, but less admirable for their speaking ability. As Italians, they would have been lacking to Cicero's ears in the smooth sophistication (urbanitas) and faultless pronunciation of the best native Roman orators. This attitude of social exclusivity may account for why Valerius Soranus, whose scholarly interests and friendships might otherwise suggest a conservative temperament, would have found his place in the civil wars of the 80s on the side of the popularist Marius rather than that of the patrician Sulla. It might also be noted that Cicero's expression of this attitude is double-edged: like Marius and the Valerii Sorani, he was also a man from a municipium, and had to overcome the same obstructing biases that he adopts and expresses.

In 82 BC, the year of his death, Valerius Soranus was or had been a tribune of the people (tribunus plebis), a political office open only to those of plebeian rather than patrician birth.

== Execution ==
The fullest account of the infamous death of Valerius Soranus is given by Servius, who says he was executed for revealing the secret name of Rome:

The tribune Valerius Soranus dared to disclose this name, according to Varro and many other sources. Some say he was hauled in by the senate and strung up on a cross; others, that he fled in fear of retribution and was apprehended by a praetor in Sicily, where he was killed by order of the senate.

Servius's account presents several difficulties. Crucifixion was a punishment generally reserved for slaves in the Late Republic; Valerius Maximus, a historian in the early Principate, reckoned that the punishment should not be inflicted on those of Roman blood even when they "deserved" it. Moreover, a tribune's person was by law sacrosanct. Finally, it is unclear whether the ten tribunes should possess the knowledge of Rome's secret name, or in what manner Soranus would have publicized it. Among sources earlier than Servius, both Pliny the Elder and Plutarch note that Valerius Soranus was punished for this violation. It has been suggested that the name was revealed in his one work for which a title is known, the Epoptides. The title, if interpreted as it sometimes is to mean "tutelary deities", offers an apt context. But elsewhere Servius—so too Macrobius—implies that the name remained unrecorded.

Quintus Valerius Soranus has been identified with the Q. Valerius, described as philologos and philomathes ("a lover of literature and learning"), whom Plutarch says was a supporter of Marius. This man was put to death by Pompey in Sicily, where he would have accompanied Carbo, the consular colleague of the recently murdered Cinna. Carbo was executed by Pompey.

In 1906, Conrad Cichorius published an article that organized the available evidence for the life of Valerius Soranus and argued that his execution was a result of the Sullan proscription in 82. The view of his death as politically motivated has prevailed among modern scholars:

His death was thus the result of being proscribed (as a supporter of Marius), and has nothing to do with religious issues of any kind. At the same time, we know that Soranus wrote works of a religious-antiquarian kind, as well as verse, and was often cited by Varro. This link with Varro must be the reason for associating the revelation of Rome's secret name with Soranus' violent death, for, as we saw, it is Varro whom Servius cites as his authority for linking the death with the revelation.

But if Varro originated the story, his reasons are hard to tease out of the roiled politics of the Late Republic. Although Varro was the friend of Valerius Soranus, in the civil war of the 40s he was on the side of the Pompeians; Caesar, however, not only pardoned him, but gave him significant appointments. The biases of the contemporary sources were not lost on Plutarch in his account of the killing:

Furthermore, Caius Oppius, the friend of Caesar, says that Pompey treated Quintus Valerius also with unnatural cruelty. For, understanding that Valerius was a man of rare scholarship and learning, when he was brought to him, Oppius says, Pompey took him aside, walked up and down with him, asked and learned what he wished from him, and then ordered his attendants to lead him away and put him to death at once. But when Oppius discourses about the enemies or friends of Caesar, one must be very cautious about believing him.

Speaking the name could be construed as a political protest and also an act of treason, as the revelation would expose the tutelary deity and leave the city unprotected. This belief rests on the power of utterance to "call forth" the deity (evocatio), so that enemies in possession of the true and secret name could divert the divine protection to themselves. The intellectual historian of the Republic Elizabeth Rawson ventured cautiously that Soranus's "motive remains unclear, but may have been political". More vigorous is the view of Luigi Alfonsi, who argued that Soranus revealed the name deliberately so that the Italian municipalities could appropriate it and break Rome's monopoly of power.

== Literary works ==
The single couplet that survives from Valerius Soranus's vast work as a poet, grammarian, and antiquarian is quoted by St. Augustine in the De civitate Dei (7.9) to support his view that the tutelary deity of Rome was the Capitoline Jupiter:

Iuppiter omnipotens regum rerumque deumque

progenitor genitrixque deum, deus unus et omnes ...

The syntax poses difficulties in attempts at translation, and there may be some corruption of the text. It seems to say something like "Jupiter All-powerful, of kings and the material world and of gods the Father (progenitor), the Mother (genetrix) of gods, God that is One and All ... ". Augustine says that his source for the quotation is a work on religion (now lost) by Varro, with whose conception of deity Augustine argues throughout Book 7 of the De civitate Dei. The view of Varro, and presumably of Soranus, was that Jupiter represents the whole universe which emits and receives seeds (semina), encompassing the generative powers of Earth the Mother as well as Sky the Father. This unitarianism is a Stoic concept, and Soranus is usually counted among the Stoics of Rome, perhaps of the contemporary school of Panaetius. The unity of opposites in deity, including divine androgyny, is also characteristic of Orphic doctrine, which may have impressed itself on Stoicism.

The couplet may or may not come from the Epoptides. The title is mentioned only in Pliny, and none of the known fragments of Soranus can be attributed to this large-scale work with certainty. Soranus's innovation in providing a table of contents—most likely a list of capita rerum ("subject headings") at the beginning—suggests that the Epoptides was an encyclopedic or compendious prose work. Alternatively, the Epoptides may have been a long didactic poem. Soranus is known to have written didactic poetry and is likely to have been an influence when Lucretius chose verse as his medium for philosophical subject matter.

The most extensive argument regarding the Epoptides is that of Thomas Köves-Zulauf. Much of what can be conjectured about the work derives from the interpretation of its title. The Greek verb ἐποπτεύω (epopteuo) has the basic meaning of "to watch, oversee" but also "to become an ἐπόπτης (epoptes, "initiate", feminine epoptis and plural epoptides), the highest grade of initiate at the Eleusinian Mysteries. Köves-Zulauf argued that Soranus's Epoptides was an extended treatment of mystery religions, and the title is sometimes translated into German as Mystikerinnen. The classicist and mythographer H.J. Rose, on the contrary, insisted that the Epoptides had nothing to do with initiates. Elizabeth Rawson held with Initiated Women; the Loeb Classical Library offers Lady Initiates; Nicholas Horsfall is satisfied with The Watchers.

Köves-Zulauf maintains that the epoptides of the title represent the Stoic conception of female daimones who are guardians of humanity, such as the Hours (Horae) and the Graces (Charites). Soranus integrates this concept, he says, with the Tutelae, ancient Italic protective spirits. The crime of Soranus was thus to reveal in this work the name of the Tutela charged with protecting Rome.

Works of later Roman grammarians suggest that Soranus took an interest in etymology and other linguistic matters.

== Annotated bibliography ==
- Alfonsi, L. "L'importanza politico-religiosa della enunciazione di Valerio Sorano (a proposito di CIL I² 337)". Epigraphica 10 (1948) 81–89. Argues that Valerius Soranus should be identified with Valerius Aedituus, a poet from the circle of Lutatius Catulus (this identification is not widely agreed upon, though both E. Badian, "From the Gracchi to Sulla (1940–59)", Historia 11 (1962), p. 222, note 94, and E. Gabba, "Politica e cultura in Roma agli inizi del I secolo a. C.", Athenaeum (1953), p. 259ff., as cited by Badian, are willing to entertain the possibility) and that he revealed the name of Rome to disrupt the exclusivity of the Roman aristocracy and enable the participation of the Italic communities. (Abstract translated from L'Année philologique.)
- Brown, John Pairman. Israel and Hellas, vol. 2. Berlin and New York: Walter de Gruyter, 1995, pp. 247–250 on Valerius Soranus.
- Cichorius, Conrad. "Zur Lebensgeschichte des Valerius Soranus". Hermes 41 (1906) 59–68. The most thorough biographical reconstruction. English abstract in American Journal of Philology 28 (1907) 468.
- Courtney, Edward. "Q. Valerius (Soranus)". The Fragmentary Latin Poets. Oxford: Clarendon Press, 1993, pp. 65–68. ISBN 0-19-814775-9 Edition with commentary and biographical note. Courtney refrains from identifying some recognized fragments of Soranus's work as poetry and thus omits them. See Funaioli and Morel following.
- De Martino, Marcello. L'identità segreta della divinità tutelare di Roma. Un riesame dell'affaire Sorano. Roma: Settimo Sigillo, 2011.
- Funaioli, Gino. Grammaticae romanae fragmenta, vol. 1. Leipzig: Teubner, 1907. Testimonia and fragments of Valerius Soranus's grammatical works, pp. 77–79.
- Horsfall, Nicholas. "Roman Religion and Related Topics". Review of Thomas Köves-Zulauf, Kleine Schriften, ed. Achim Heinrichs (Heidelberg 1988). Classical Review 41 (1991) 120–122.
- Klinghardt, Matthias. "Prayer Formularies for Public Recitation: Their Use and Function in Ancient Religion". Numen 46 (1999) 1–52. On the case of Valerius Soranus, pp. 43–45.
- Köves-Zulauf, Thomas. "Die Ἐπόπτιδες des Valerius Soranus". Rheinisches Museum 113 (1970) 323–358. Reprinted in the author's Kleine Schriften, ed. Achim Heinrichs (Heidelberg 1988). Argument summarized under Literary works.
- Morel, Willy, with Karl Büchner and Jürgen Blänsdorf. Fragmenta poetarum Latinorum epicorum et lyricorum praeter Ennium et Lucilium. 3rd edition. Stuttgart: Teubner, 1995. Contains fragments of Valerius Soranus not presented in Courtney.
- Murphy, Trevor. "Privileged Knowledge: Valerius Soranus and the Secret Name of Rome". In Rituals in Ink: A Conference on Religion and Literary Production in Ancient Rome (Stuttgart 2004), pp. 127–137. ISBN 3-515-08526-2 Rehearses sources for nomen transgression, with a stated interest in the significance of the story rather than its historicity. Some misapprehensions in handling primary source material.
- Niccolini, Giovanni. I fasti dei tribuni della plebe. Milan 1934. Section on Valerius Soranus, pp. 430–431.
- Rüpke, Jörg. Religion of the Romans. Translated and edited by Richard Gordon. Cambridge: Polity, 2007. ISBN 0-7456-3014-6 Discusses the case of Valerius Soranus (p. 133) in his consideration of Rome's tutelary deity.
- Weinstock, Stefan. Review of Die Geheime Schutzgottheit von Rom by Angelo Brelich. Journal of Roman Studies 40 (1950) 149–150. Passing consideration of the likely political character of Valerius Soranus's execution, valuable mainly because of Weinstock's auctoritas.
