= List of presidents of the Province of Frosinone =

President of the Province of Frosinone
- Presidente della Provincia di Frosinone
- Incumbent; Luca Di Stefano since 22 December 2022
- Term length: 4 years
- Formation: 1927

The president of the Province of Frosinone is the head of the provincial government in Frosinone, Lazio, Italy. The president oversees the administration of the province, coordinates the activities of the municipalities, and represents the province in regional and national matters.

Since December 2022, the office has been held by Luca Di Stefano of the Democratic Party.

== History ==
The Province of Frosinone was established in 1927 by the Fascist government. Local autonomy had been abolished and provincial administrations were placed under central control, with appointed officials replacing elected presidents.

After the establishment of the Italian Republic, the office was restored and the president was again elected by the Provincial Council starting from 1951. In 1995, a reform introduced the direct election of the president by popular vote. The Province of Frosinone was eventually reformed in 2014 under national legislation on provinces, with its functions reduced in favour of the Lazio region and local municipalities.

== List ==
=== Presidents of the Province (since 1951) ===
No.	Portrait	Name	Term of office		Party
No.	Portrait	Name	Start	End	Party
		Cesare Augusto Fanelli	?	1958	Christian Democracy
		?	?	?	?
		Antonio Ferraro	1975	?	Christian Democracy
		Massimo Struffi	1982	1 August 1990	Italian Socialist Party
		Francesco Gargani	1 August 1990	13 July 1992	Christian Democracy
		Mario Coratti	13 July 1992	26 May 1993	Italian Socialist Party
		Orazio Paolo Riccardi	26 May 1993	23 April 1994	Democratic Party of the Left
		Domenico Testani	23 April 1994	8 May 1995	Italian People's Party
		Loreto Gentile	8 May 1995	13 June 1999	Italian People's Party
		Francesco Scalia	13 June 1999	14 June 2004	Italian People's Party; The Daisy; Democratic Party
		Francesco Scalia	14 June 2004	21 June 2009	Italian People's Party; The Daisy; Democratic Party
		Antonello Iannarilli	22 June 2009	8 November 2012	The People of Freedom
		Fabio De Angelis (acting)	8 November 2012	13 October 2014	The People of Freedom
		Antonio Pompeo	13 October 2014	31 October 2018	Democratic Party
		Antonio Pompeo	31 October 2018	22 December 2022	Democratic Party
		Luca Di Stefano	22 December 2022	Incumbent	Democratic Party

== Sources ==
- Mazzocchi, Ermisio (2013). Frosinone: una provincia al voto 1946–2013. Rome: Aracne.
- "Storia amministrativa dell'ente". Ministero dell'Interno.
