= Luca Di Stefano =

Italian politician (born 1990)

President of the Province of Frosinone
- Incumbent
- Assumed office 22 December 2022
- Preceded by: Antonio Pompeo

Mayor of Sora
- Incumbent
- Assumed office 19 October 2021
- Preceded by: Roberto De Donatis

Personal details
- Born: 9 August 1990 (age 36) Sora, Lazio, Italy

Luca Di Stefano (born 9 August 1990) is an Italian politician serving as president of the province of Frosinone since 2022. He has served as mayor of Sora since 2021.
