= Antonello Iannarilli =

Italian politician (born 1961)

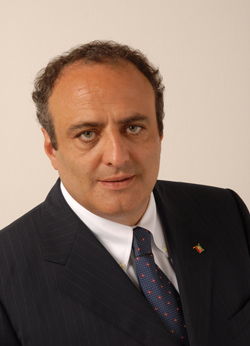

Member of the Chamber of Deputies
- In office 28 April 2006 – 14 March 2013
- Constituency: Lazio 2

President of the Province of Frosinone
- In office 22 June 2009 – 8 November 2012
- Preceded by: Francesco Scalia
- Succeeded by: Antonio Pompeo

Regional assessor for Agriculture of Lazio
- In office 17 May 2000 – 17 February 2005
- President: Francesco Storace

Member of the Regional Council of Lazio
- In office 15 May 1995 – April 2006

Personal details
- Born: 24 December 1961 (age 64) Alatri, Province of Frosinone, Italy
- Party: Brothers of Italy (since 2019); Previously: DC (1990–1994); FI (1994–2008); PdL (2008–2013); FI (2013–2019)
- Education: University of Cassino and Southern Lazio
- Profession: Building entrepreneur

Antonello Iannarilli (born 24 December 1961) is an Italian politician who served as a member of the Regional Council of Lazio from 1995 to 2006, a member of the Chamber of Deputies from 2006 to 2013, and president of the Province of Frosinone from 2009 to 2012.
