= San Domenico, Orzinuovi =

Church building in Orzinuovi, Italy

San Domenico is a Renaissance style, Roman Catholic church located on Via Amondi in Orzinuovi, Province of Brescia, in the region of Lombardy, Italy.

== History ==
Originally a church at the site, attached to a Dominican Convent, was built in the 1500s and dedicated to Santa Maria delle Grazie. This church was mostly razed to build a hospital in the 19th century. Rebuilt in smaller dimensions, it maintains cubicles used for interrogations by the Inquisition. The church, now property of the adjacent hospital, was undergoing restoration in 2014.

The interior contains an altarpiece depicting Enthroned Madonna and Child with Saints Dominic, Joseph, Vincent Ferrer, and Lucy, along with a Donor by Moretto da Brescia; a Madonna Addolorata with Christ and Saints Francis, Thomas, and Carlo Borromeo with Donor and a Saints Nicola da Bari, Peter Martyr and Cosma and a Coronation of the Virgin by Grazio Cossali. The main altarpiece depicts Granting of the Rosary to St Dominic by Luca Mombello. The paintings depicting St Vincent Ferrer and St Hyacinth of Poland are from the studio of Mombello. A Virgin and two Saints was painted by Ludovico Costa. A canvas depicting St Roch among those afflicted by plague, by Pier Maria Bagnatore, was stolen in May 2000.
