= Suranus =

Saint Suranus
- Residence: Umbria, Italy
- Died: c. 580
- Canonized: Pre-congregation
- Feast: 24 January

Saint Suranus (died c. 580) was an abbot in Umbria, Italy who was martyred by Lombards. His feast day is 24 January.

== Life ==
Suranus was abbot of a monastery at Sora near Caserta, Italy. He was martyred by marauding Lombards around 580 AD when they found his monastery was empty. The Roman Martyrology under the Twenty-fourth Day of January just notes, "Also, blessed Suranus, abbot, who lived in the time of the Lombards."

== Monks of Ramsgate account ==
The monks of St Augustine's Abbey, Ramsgate wrote in their Book of Saints (1921),

Suranus (St.) Abbot. (Jan. 24)
(6th cent.) An Abbot in Central Italy who, on the approach of the Lombards, then devastating the Peninsula, expended all the goods of his monastery in relieving the poor fugitives, and was on that account, when the Barbarians found that there was nothing to pillage in the Abbey, murdered by them. St. Gregory is emphatic in his praises of St. Suranus.

== Butler's account ==
The hagiographer Alban Butler (1710–1773) wrote in his Lives of the Fathers, Martyrs, and Other Principal Saints under January 24,

On the same day. St Suranus, abbot in Umbria, who gave all things, even the herbs out of his garden, to the poor. He was martyred by the Lombards in the seventh century, and his relics were famed for miracles. (Note: Note 1. St. Greg. Dial. l. 4. c. 22.)

== Sources ==
- Butler, Alban (1798), The Lives of the Primitive Fathers, Martyrs, and Other Principal Saints, J. Moir This article incorporates text from this source, which is in the public domain.
- Cardinal Gibbons, ed. (1916), The Roman martyrology, Baltimore: John Murphy
- "January 24", Orthodox Europe, St John's Orthodox Church, Colchester
- St. Augustine's Abbey, Ramsgate (1921), The Book of saints : a dictionary of servants of God canonized by the Catholic Church, London: A. & C. Black, ltd. This article incorporates text from this source, which is in the public domain.
