= Ludovica =

- Gender: female

Origin
- Origin: German
- Meaning: “famous in battle”
- Region of origin: Italy

Other names
- Related names: Louis, Louise, Ludovic, Ludovico, Ludwig

Ludovica or Ludovika or Ludowika is a feminine given name, a counterpart of the masculine names Ludovic or Ludovico and the related Louis or Ludwig. As of 2021, it was among the ten most popular names for newborn girls in Italy.

== People ==
- Ludovica Albertoni (1473-1533), Italian Roman Catholic noblewoman from the Renaissance period and a professed member of the Third Order of Saint Francis
- Princess Ludovika of Bavaria (1808-1892), daughter of King Maximilian I Joseph of Bavaria and his second wife, Karoline of Baden, and the mother of Empress Elisabeth of Austria
- Ludovica Caramis (born 1991), Italian model and showgirl
- Ludovica Cavalli (born 2000), Italian athlete
- Ludovica Francesconi (born 1999), Italian actress
- Maria Ludovica Costa (born 2000), Italian rower for Rowing Club Genovese
- Ludovica Levy (1856-1922), Danish actress, theatre director and theatre critic
- Ludovica Martino (born 1997), Italian actress
- Ludovica Modugno (1949-2021), Italian actress
- Ludovica Nasti (born 2006), Italian actress
- Ludovica Sannazzaro, Italian internet personality
- Ludovica Thornam (1853-1896), Danish portrait and genre painter
- Ludovica Torelli (1500-1569), ruling Countess of Guastalla in 1522–1539
- Ludowika Margaretha of Zweibrücken-Bitsch (1540-1569), noblewoman

== Other uses ==
- 292 Ludovica, a Main-belt asteroid
- Ludovica Academy, former military training institute in Hungary
