= Francesco Scalia =

Italian politician (born 1962)

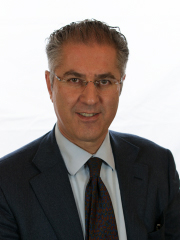

Member of the Senate of the Republic
- In office 15 March 2013 – 22 March 2018
- Constituency: Lazio

Member of the Regional Council of Lazio
- In office 16 April 2010 – 25 February 2013

Regional assessor for Human resources, Public property and Assets of Lazio
- In office 13 February 2009 – 30 March 2010
- President: Piero Marrazzo

President of the Province of Frosinone
- In office 13 June 1999 – 21 June 2009
- Preceded by: Loreto Gentile
- Succeeded by: Antonello Iannarilli

Mayor of Ferentino
- In office 20 December 1996 – 28 May 2001
- Preceded by: Fabio Schietroma
- Succeeded by: Roberto Valeri

Personal details
- Born: 6 December 1962 (age 63) Picinisco, Province of Frosinone, Italy
- Party: Democratic Party
- Education: Sapienza University of Rome
- Profession: Lawyer

Francesco Scalia (born 6 December 1962) is an Italian lawyer and politician of the Democratic Party. He served as mayor of Ferentino from 1996 to 2001, president of the Province of Frosinone from 1999 to 2009, a member of the Regional Council of Lazio from 2010 to 2013, and a member of the Senate from 2013 to 2018.
