= Alessio Giustini =

Italian footballer (born 1991)

Personal information
- Full name: Alessio Giustini
- Date of birth: July 27, 1991 (age 35)
- Place of birth: Sora, Italy
- Position: Midfielder

Team information
- Current team: Giulianova (on loan from Pescara)

Youth career
- Pescara

Senior career*
Years	Team	Apps	(Gls)
2011–	Pescara	0	(0)
2012–	→ Giulianova (loan)	24	(1)
- * Club domestic league appearances and goals as of 22 May 2012

Alessio Giustini (born 27 July 1991) is an Italian footballer who plays as a midfielder for Giulianova on loan from Pescara.
