= Marco Caricchia =

Italian painter

Marco Caricchia (circa 1756 – after 1797) was an Italian painter of the late-Baroque period, active mainly in Southern Italy and Rome. He was active mainly in portraits and manuscript illumination.

Marco Caricchia, Portrait of cardinal Carlo Livizzani, oil on canvas, 1788, Museo Civico di Modena

== Life ==
He was born in Arpino, trained in Rome under Pompeo Batoni.
