= Montecchio Vesponi =

Coordinates: 43°19′00″N 11°55′33″E

Montecchio Vesponi Montecchio Vesponi (Italian)
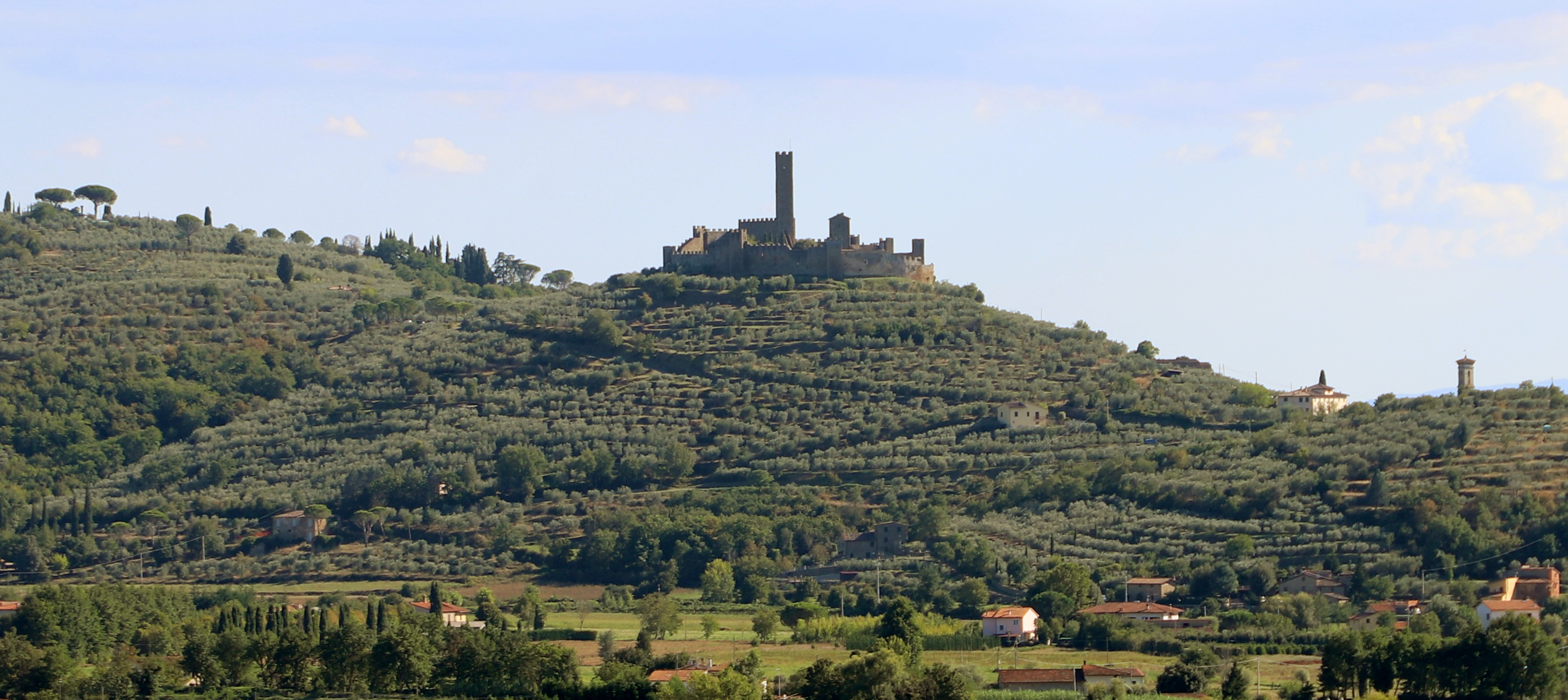
- Interactive map of Montecchio Vesponi
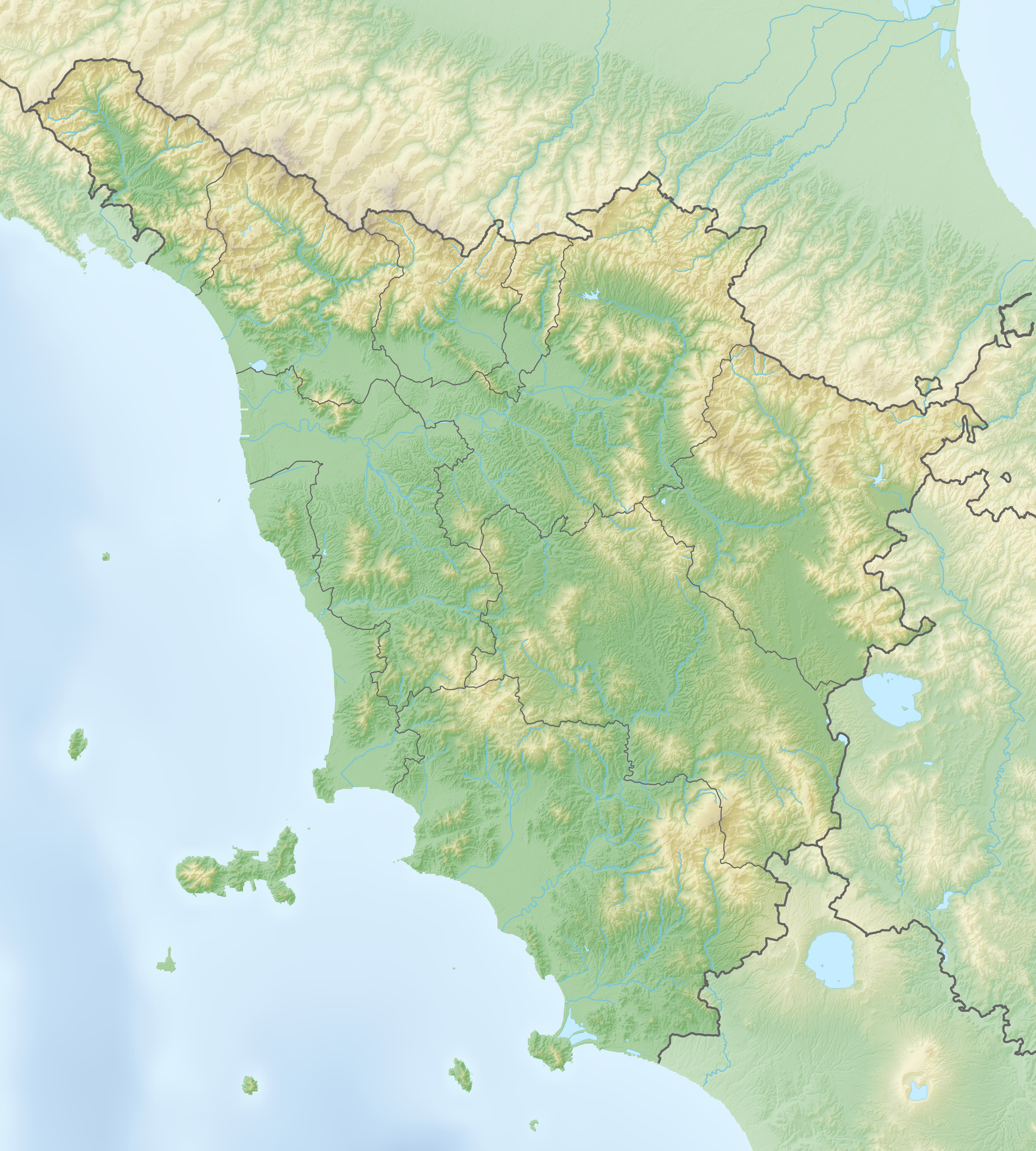
- Location within Tuscany
- Country: Italy
- Province: Arezzo
- Municipality: Castiglion Fiorentino

Montecchio Vesponi is a small village part of the municipality of Castiglion Fiorentino, province of Arezzo. Located 4km south of Castiglion Fiorentino, it lies on a hill at the bottom of the Chio valley, 364m above sea level. There are about 1200 inhabitants.

The village is home to the Montecchio Vesponi castle.

== History ==
The first dwellings on the hill of Montecchio date to the Etruscan and Roman periods when a sanctuary might have been built there.

Around the 9th century the castle was built, part of the fee of the Marchiones family. In 1014, the first mention of the castle in documents appears, when the Holy Roman Emperor Henry II gave of control of the castle to the Abbey of Farneta.

Other related feudal were the Orselli and Panzoni of Cortona or the Da Vitiano. At the beginning of the 13th century, it became allied with the municipality of Arezzo and the castles of Mammi and Monticello.

In 1234, it was bought by the municipality of Arezzo which settled more people there, making it a municipality under its influence and a stronghold against Castiglion Fiorentino and Cortona.

In 1281, Montecchio became a free town, although still under the jurisdiction of Arezzo. During this time the castle walls were enlarged and 9 towers were built, completing the fortress which is visible today, making it similar to Montecolognola and Monteriggioni.

In 1289, after the defeat suffered by Arezzo in the battle of Campaldino, it passed to the rule of Florence. It switched back to Arezzo in 1303 and at the beginning of the 14th century was a stronghold against Perugia.

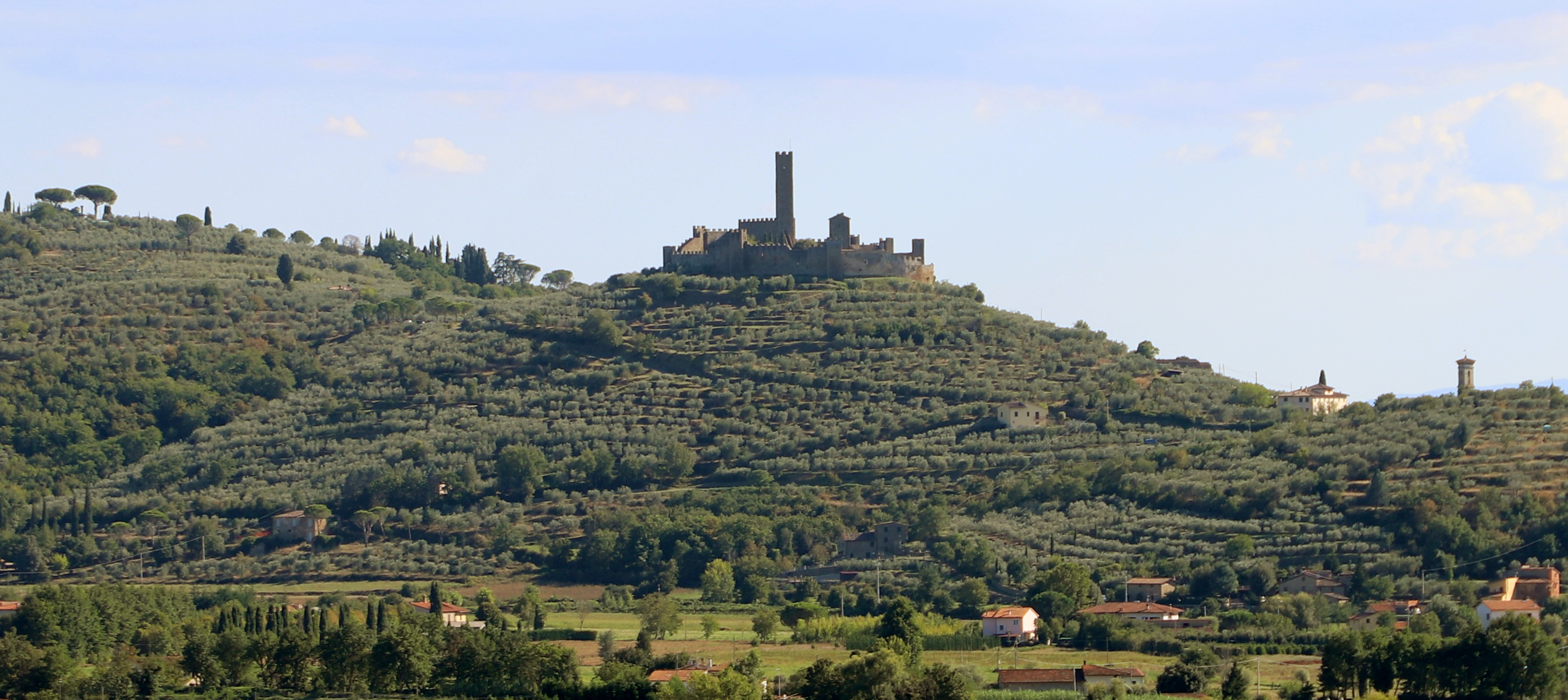

In 1304 Perugia conquered it, and ruled it until in 1369 it returned to Arezzo's influence.

In around 1383, the Arezzo military being weak and without control of its territory, the castle was occupied by John Hawkwood, known in Italy as "Giovanni Acuto", who settled there. Upon his death in 1394, Montecchio became again the property of the municipality of Florence and was used by Florentine administrators.

It was made part of the Castiglion Fiorentino municipality in 1774 with administrative reform of Leopold II, Duke of Tuscany.

In the 1870s the castle, formerly subdivided into many small properties, was bought by banker Giacomo Servadio who started restoration work. It was later sold to the Budini-Gattai family which restored the tower and continued consolidating the walls. It was then abandoned.

In 1979, it was sold to the Floridi-Viterbini family, and it became the property of Countess Orietta Floridi.

== Pictures ==
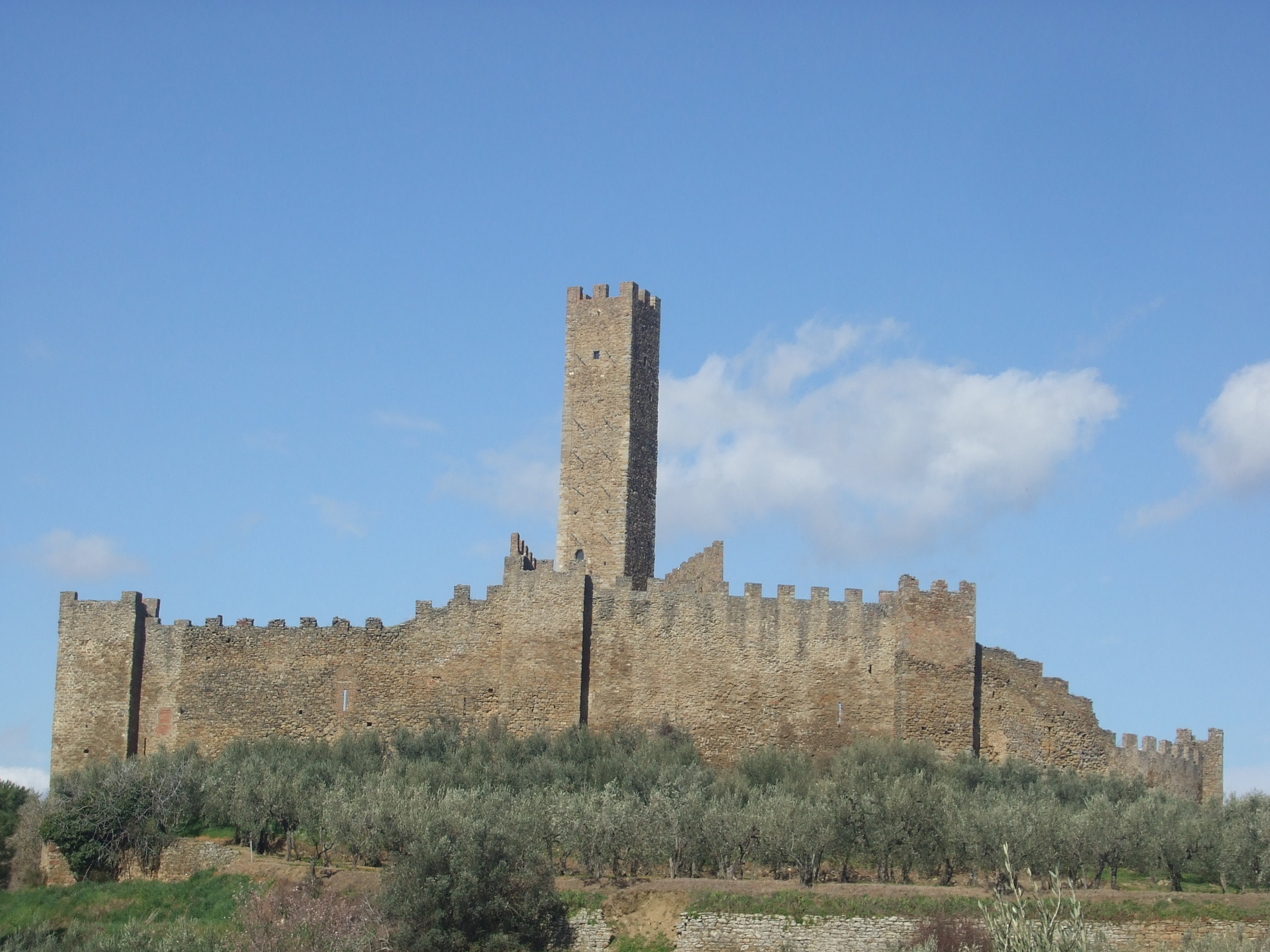
South view of the castle

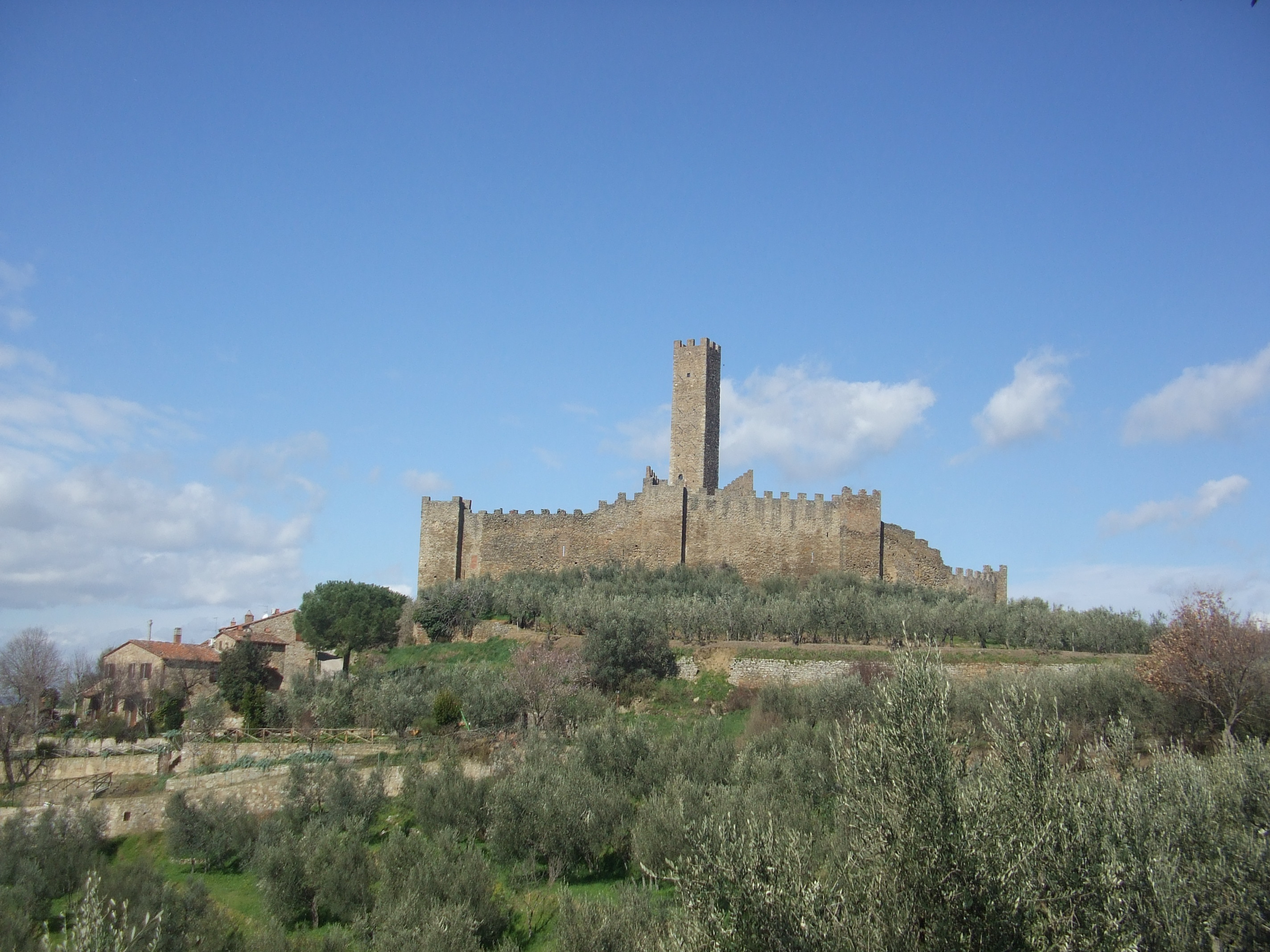
Castle with ancient country house in front

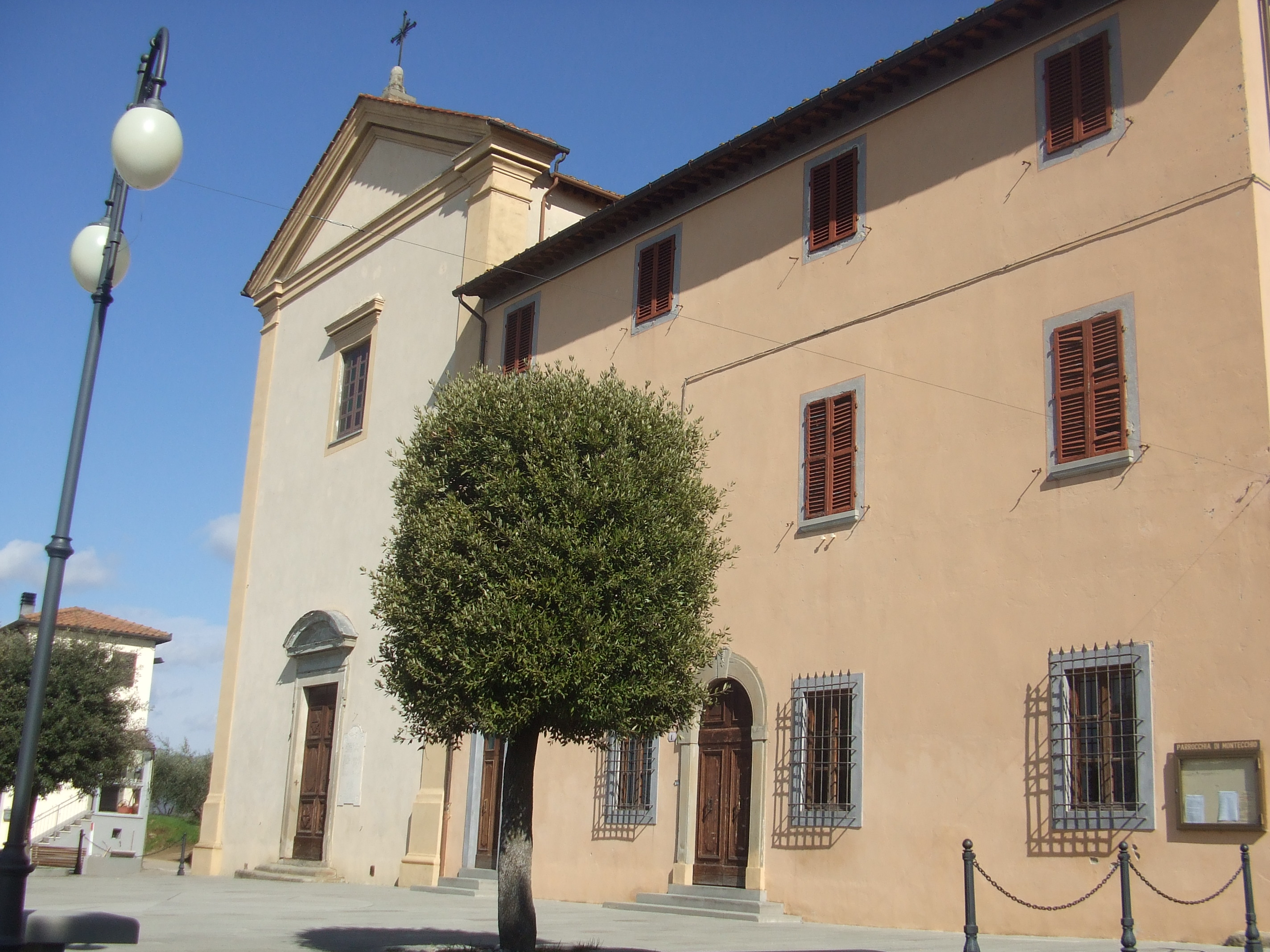
Church of Montecchio

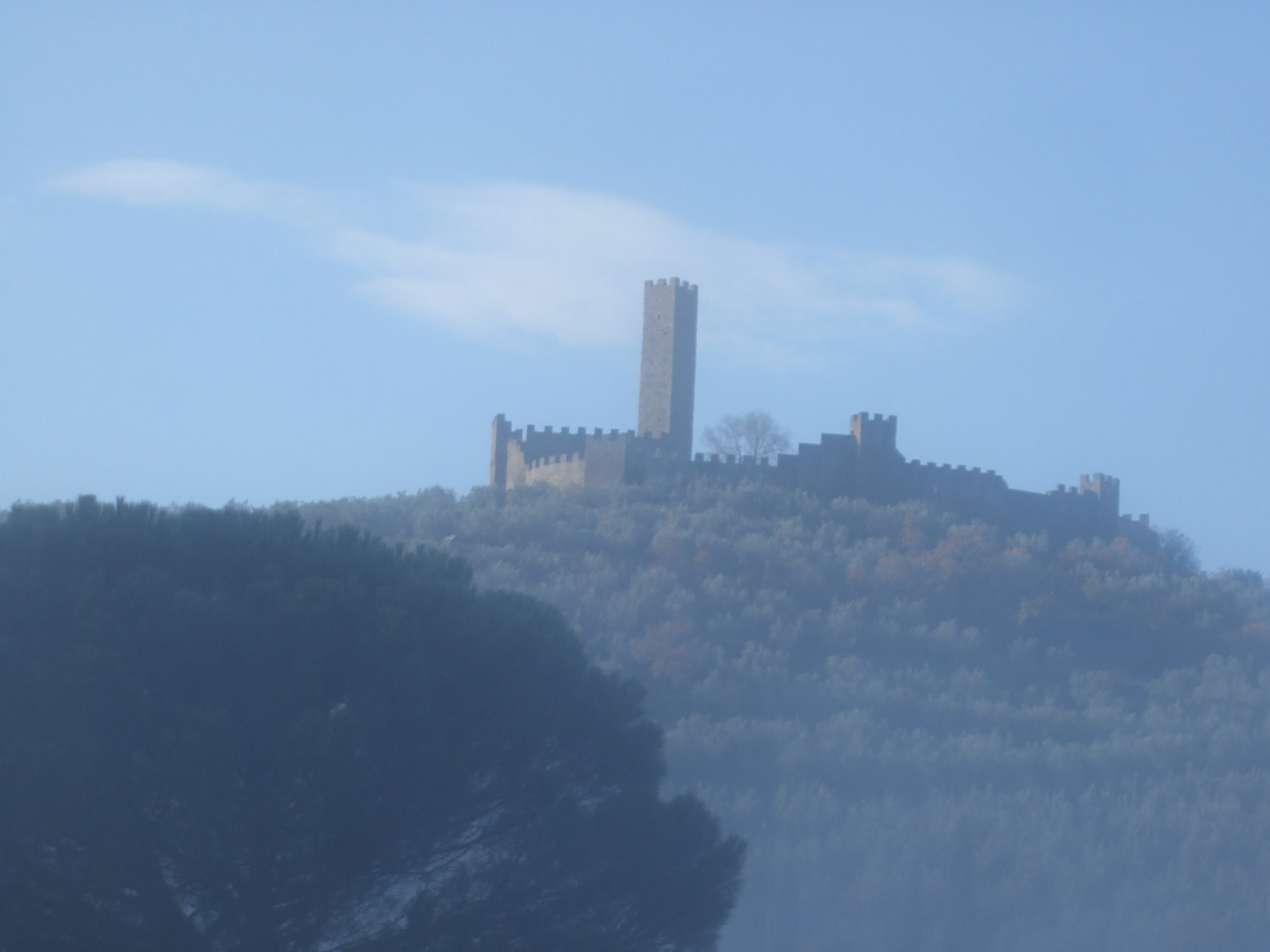
Montecchio castle on a foggy day

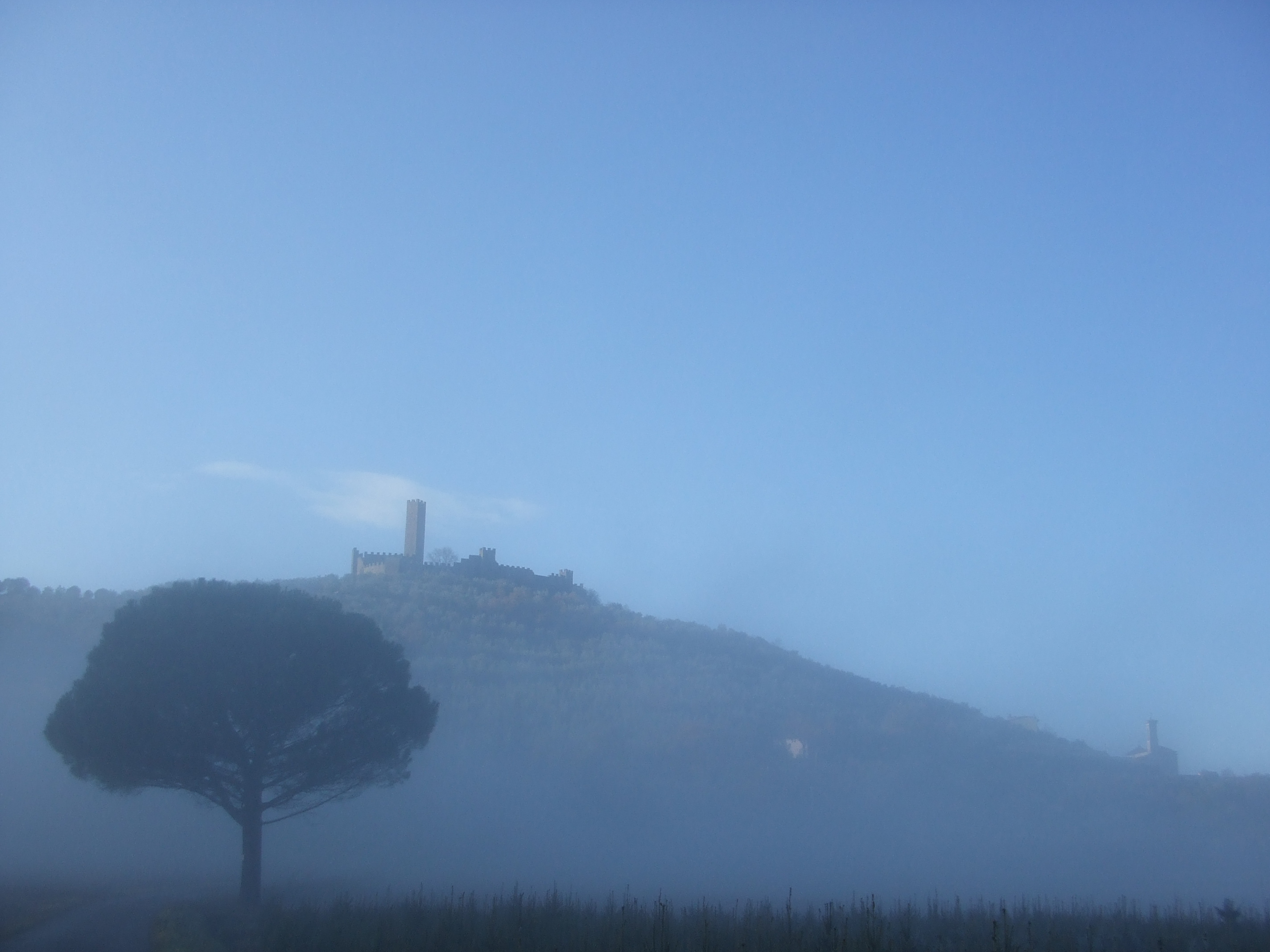
Autumn view of the castle from Bigurro valley

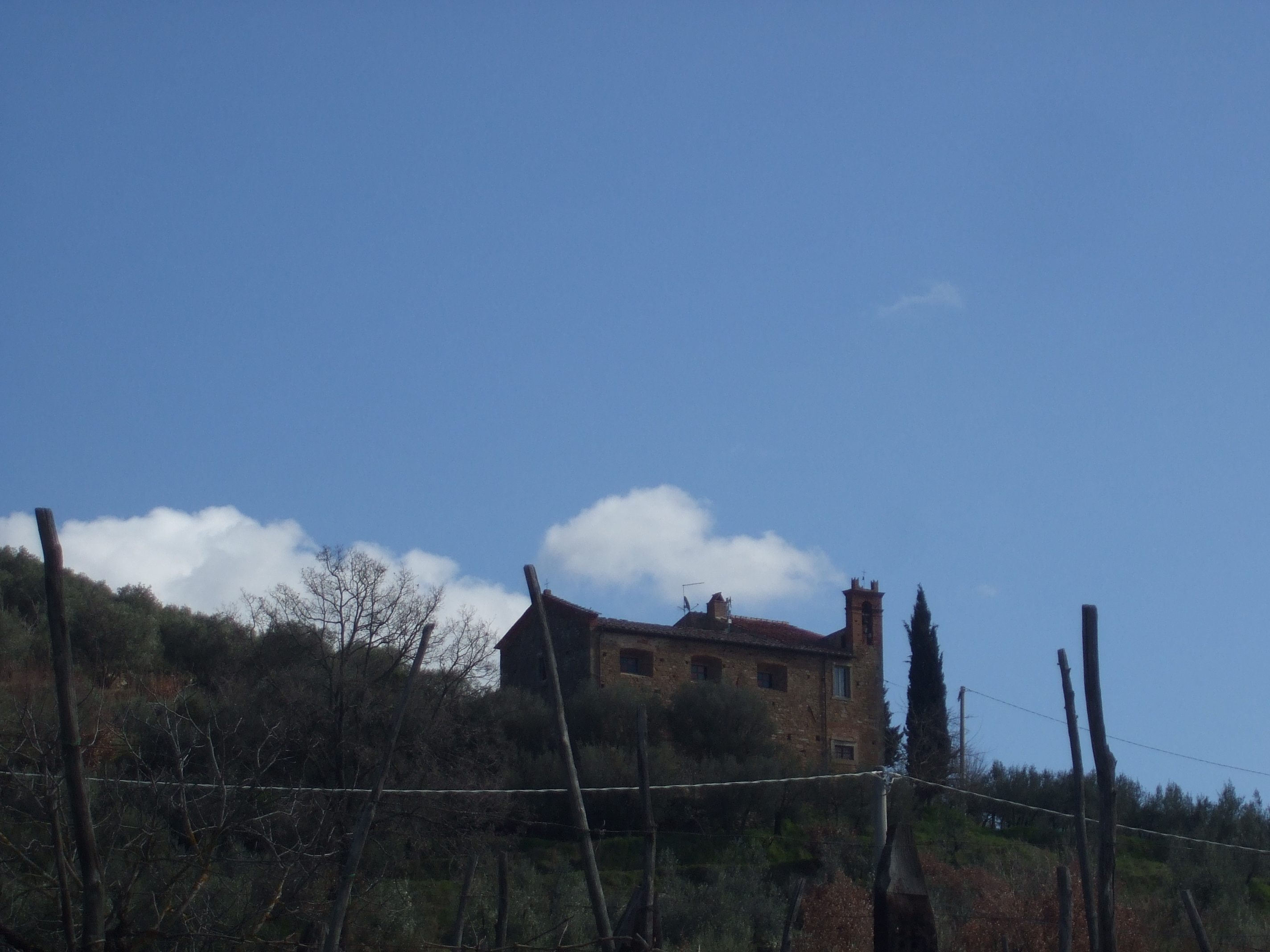
Our Lady in Riccardi

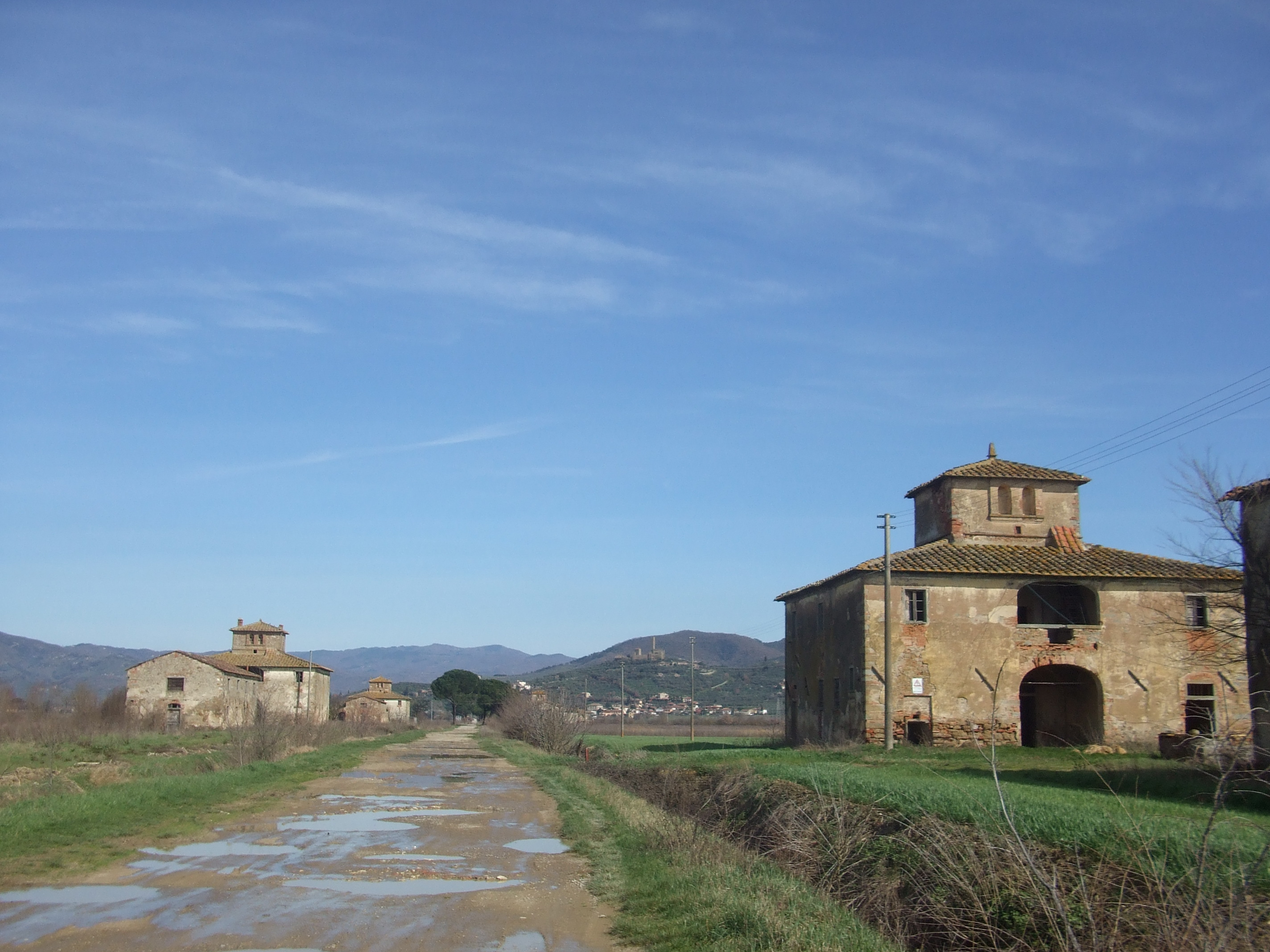
Typical houses by the street
