= Vittorio Cristini =

Italian footballer

Personal information
- Date of birth: 24 May 1928
- Place of birth: Sora, Italy
- Date of death: 29 September 1974 (aged 46)
- Place of death: Sora, Italy
- Position: Striker

Senior career*
Years	Team	Apps	(Gls)
1946–1948	Sora		
1948–1949	Roma	5	(1)
- * Club domestic league appearances and goals

Vittorio Cristini (24 May 1928 in Sora – 29 September 1974) was an Italian professional football player.

He played 5 games and scored 1 goal in the Serie A for A.S. Roma in the 1948/49 season.
