= Lodovico Fumicelli =

Italian painter

Lodovico Fumicelli (active c. 1536) was an Italian painter of the Renaissance period. He was a native of Treviso. It is not known whether he was a pupil of Titian, but he was clearly influenced. In 1536 he painted the main altarpiece of the church of the Padri Eremitani at Padua, representing the Virgin and Infant seated in glory, with St. Augustine, St. James, and St. Marina below. In the church of the Padri Serviti at Trevigi, he painted a picture of St. Liberale and St. Catharine, with two laterals, representing St. Sebastian and St. Philip, the latter the founder of their order.
