= Sora, Lazio =

Italian comune in Lazio

Sora
- Comune
- Comune di Sora
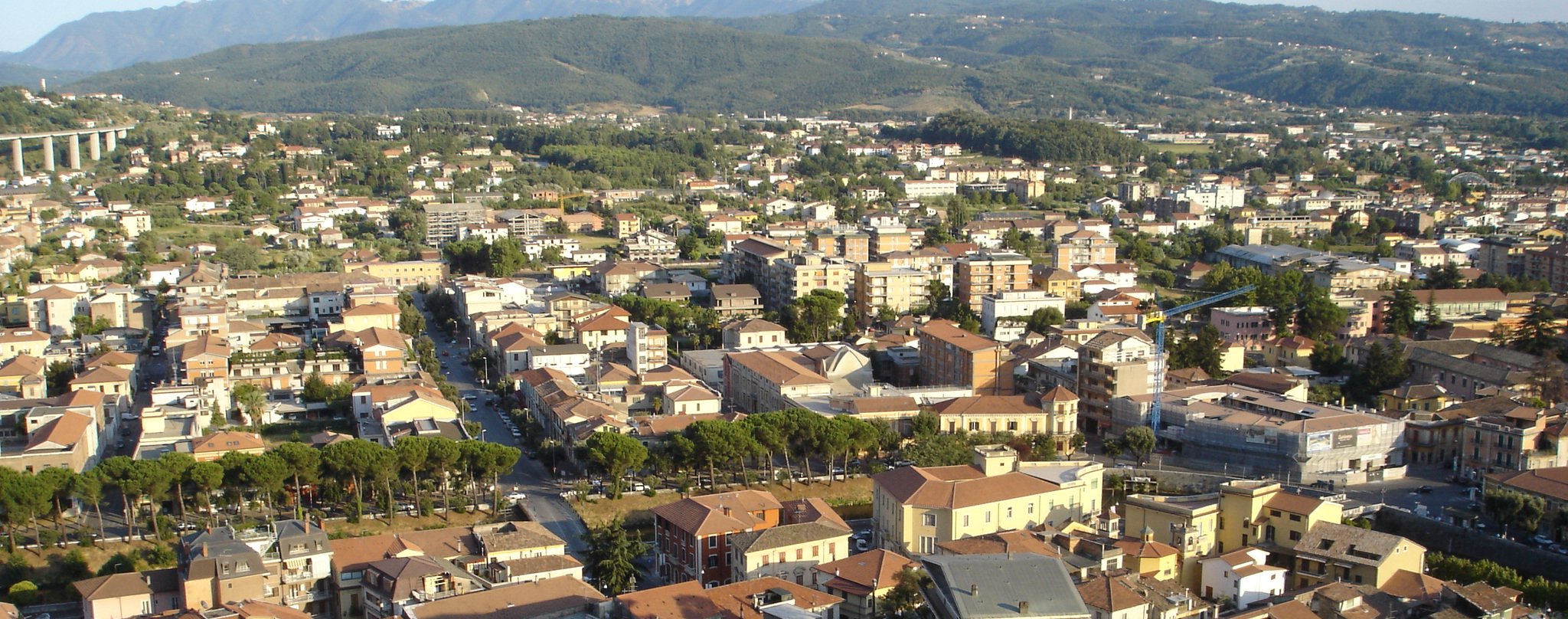
- Panoramic view

- Coat of arms

- Sora within the Province of Frosinone

- Location within Italy Location within Lazio
- Coordinates: 41°43′N 13°37′E
- Country: Italy
- Region: Lazio
- Province: Frosinone (FR)

Government
  - Mayor: Luca Di Stefano

Area
  - Total: 72.13 km^{2} (27.85 sq mi)
- Elevation: 300 m (980 ft)

Population (31 December 2024)
  - Total: 24,733
  - Density: 342.9/km^{2} (888.1/sq mi)
- Demonym: Sorano
- Time zone: UTC+1 (CET)
  - Summer (DST): UTC+2 (CEST)
- Postal code: 03039
- Dialing code: 0776
- Patron saint: Santa Restituta
- Saint day: May 27
- Website: Official website

Sora (Italian pronunciation: [ˈsɔːra]) is a town and comune of Lazio, Italy, in the province of Frosinone. It is built in a plain on the banks of the Liri. This part of the valley is the seat of some important manufacturing, especially of paper mills. The area around Sora is famous for the costumes of its peasants.

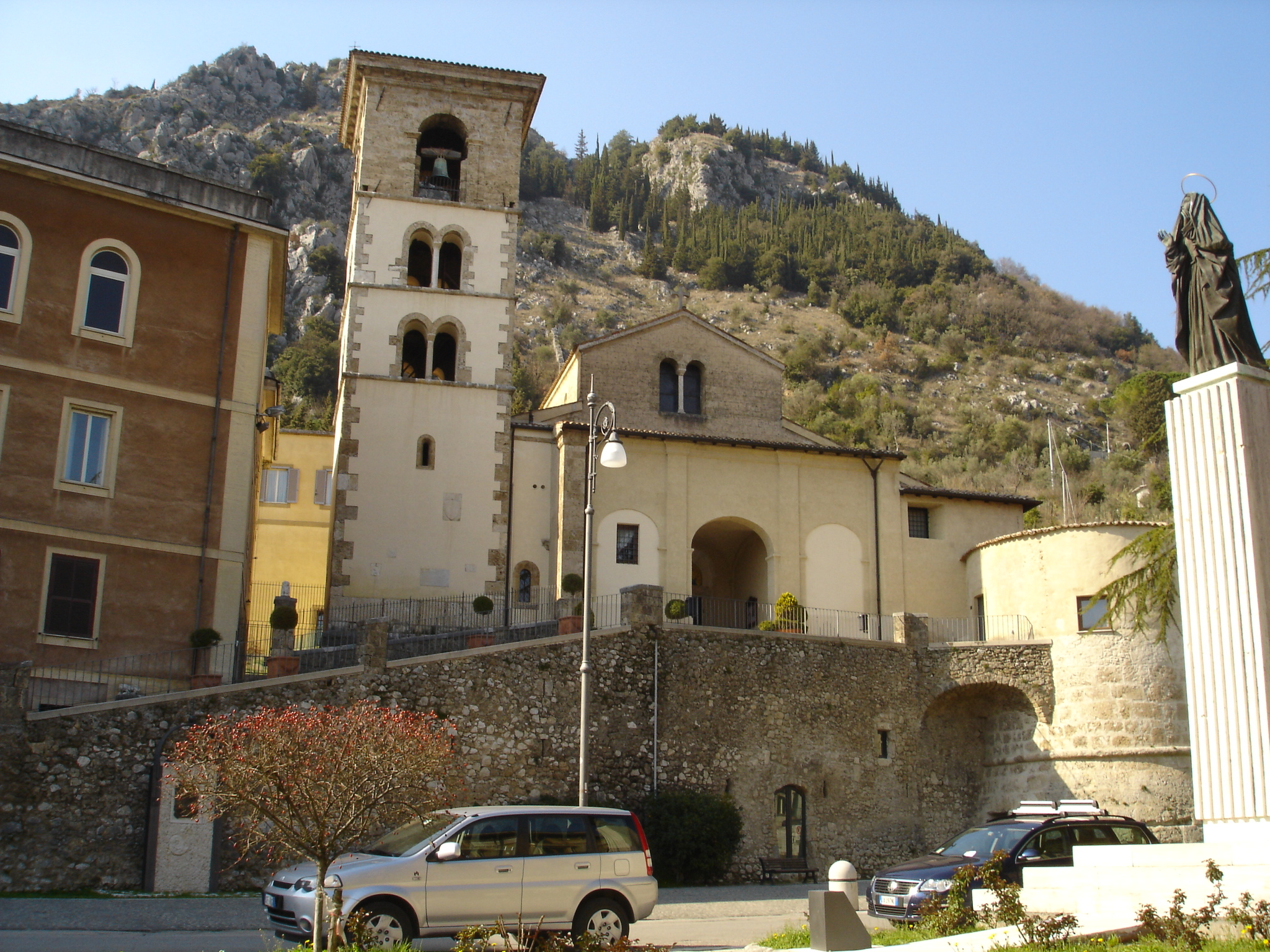
Cathedral.

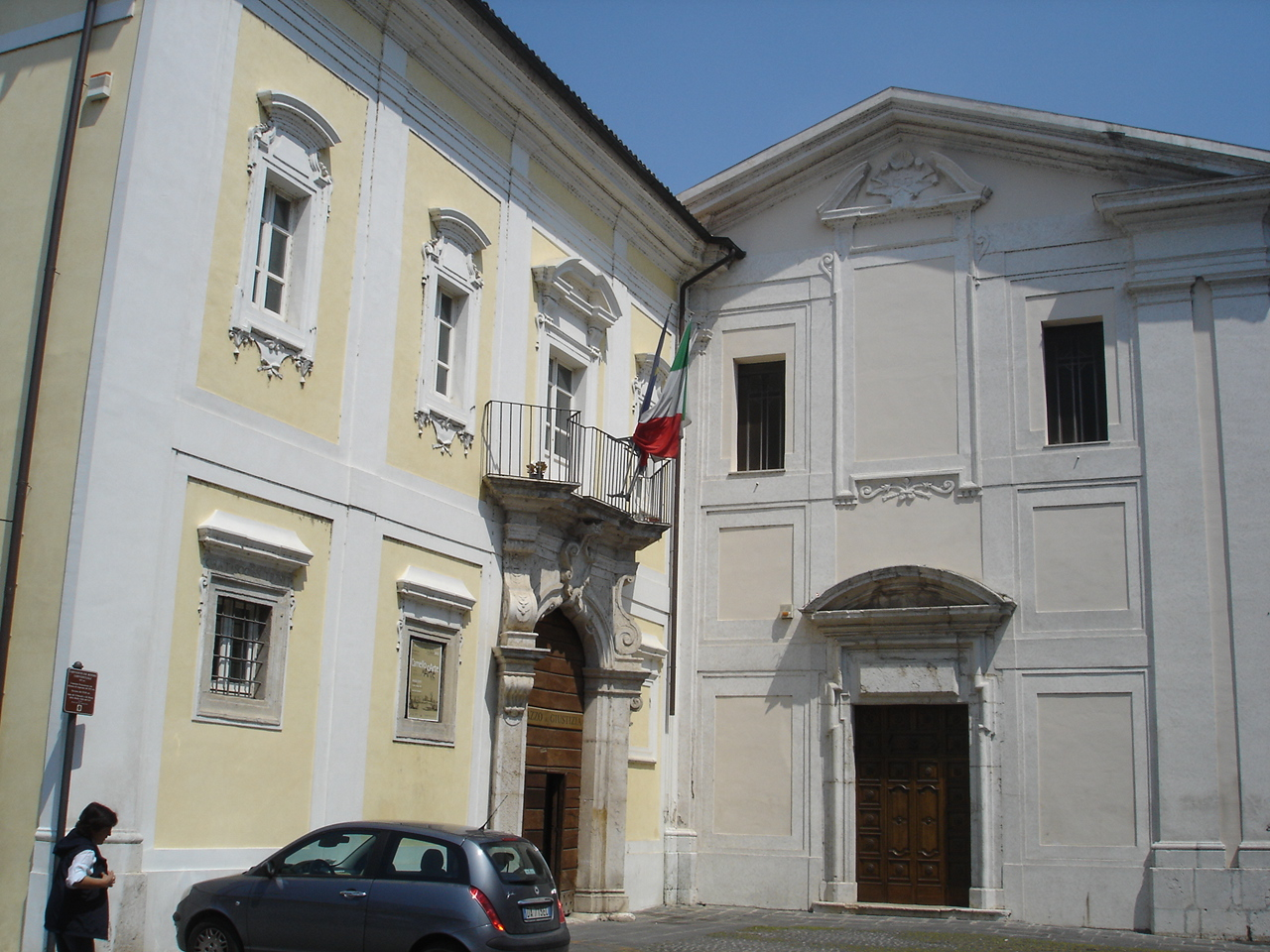
Justice Palace

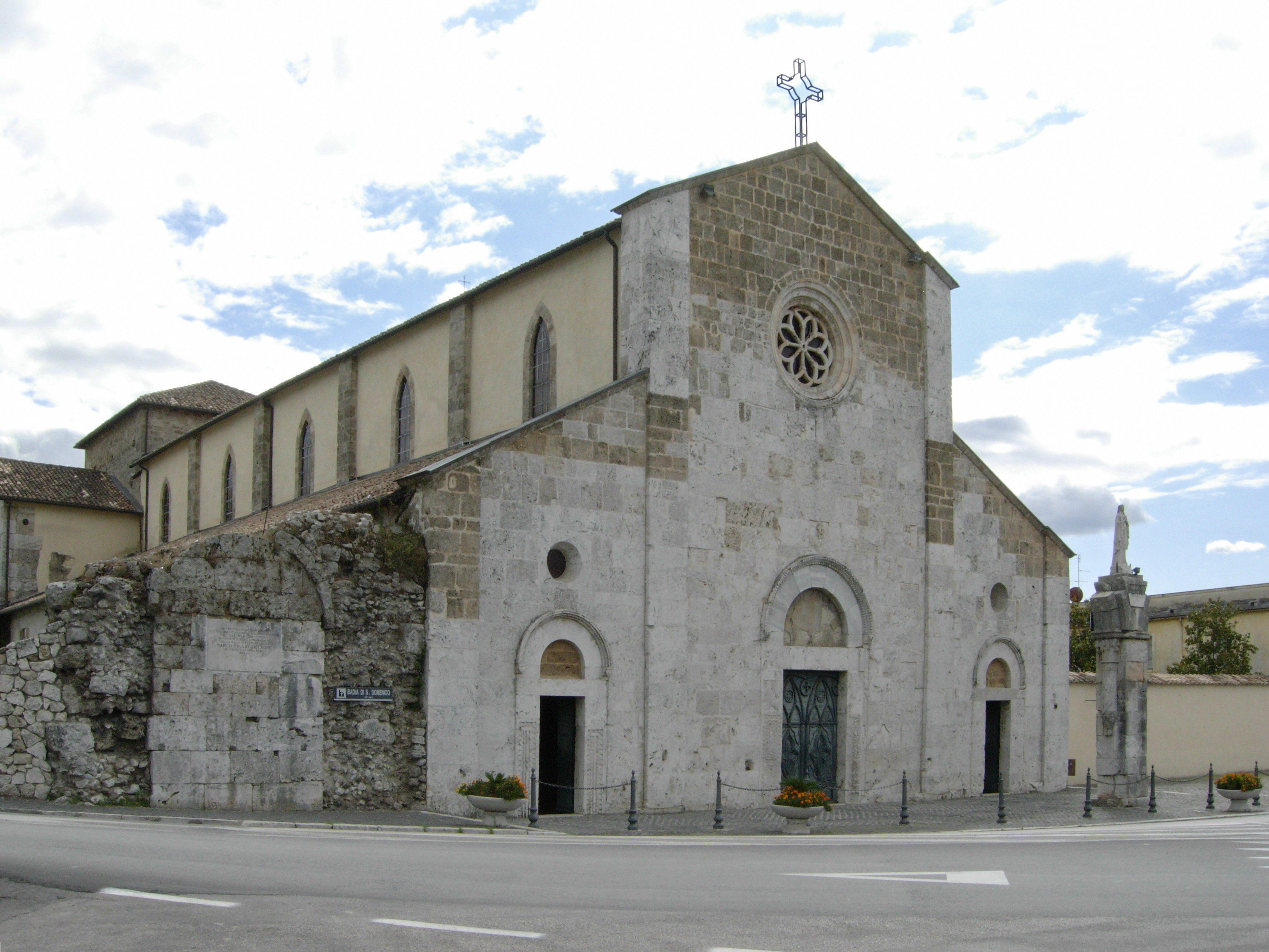
St. Dominic Abbey.

== History ==
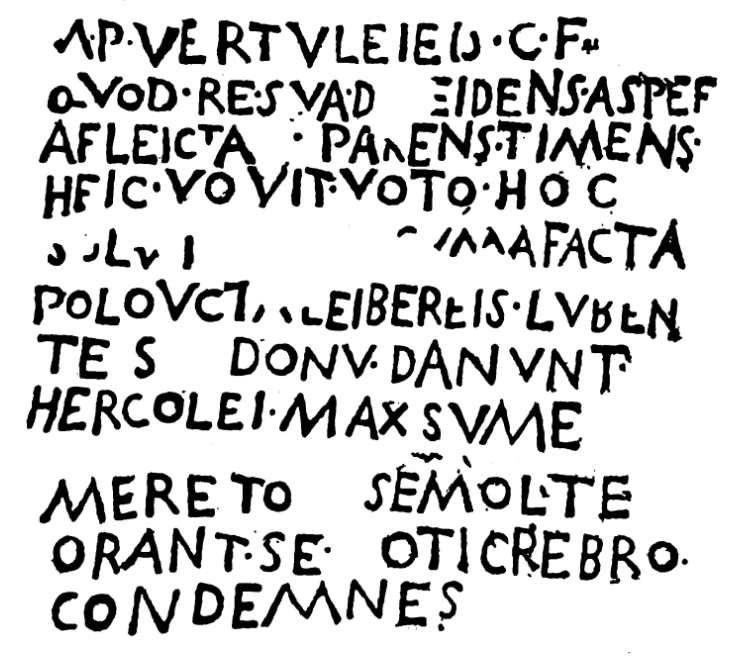
The mysterious inscription of Sora.

Sora, an ancient Volscian town, was thrice captured by the Romans, in 345, 314, and 305 BCE, before they managed, in 303, by means of a colony 4,000 strong, to confirm its annexation as a Latin colony. In 209, it was one of the colonies that refused further contributions to the war against Hannibal. By the lex Julia, it became a municipium, but under Augustus, it was colonized by soldiers of the legio IV Sorana, which had been mainly enrolled there. It belonged technically to Latium adiectum.

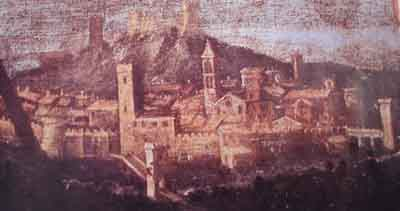
The city and the ducal palace in 1604

Located in the Ducatus Romanus under the authority of the pope during the early Dark Ages, it was captured by the Lombards of Gisulf I of Benevento in 705.

The castle of Sorella, built on the rocky height above the town, was in the Middle Ages a stronghold of some note. In 1229, during the War of the Keys, it submitted to the Papacy and was then sacked by the Emperor Frederick II, its inhabitants hanged. In 1443, King Alfonso of Naples made Sora the seat of an independent Duchy; it was afterwards seized by Pope Pius II, but being restored to the Cantelmi by Pope Sixtus IV, it ultimately passed to the duke Giovanni della Rovere. Against Cesare Borgia, the city was defended by Francesco Maria I della Rovere. It was purchased by Pope Gregory XIII for 11,000 ducats and bestowed under the suzerainty of Gregory's son, Giacomo Boncompagni (who was the first duke of Sora of the family).

== Geography ==
The distance from Sora to centre of Rome is 115 km; heading in the opposite direction, the downtown area of Naples is 138 km from Sora.

The municipality, located next to Abruzzo, borders with Arpino, Balsorano (AQ), Broccostella, Campoli Appennino, Castelliri, Isola del Liri, Monte San Giovanni Campano, Pescosolido, and Veroli.

== Main sights ==
The original cathedral, consecrated by Pope Adrian IV in 1155, was destroyed by the earthquake of 1634.

Above the town on a precipitous rock, elevation 540 metres (1,770 ft), that guards the Liri's valley and the entrance to the Abruzzi are remains of polygonal walls; here, possibly, was the citadel of the original Volscian town. Also, remains of medieval fortifications are there.

Among the churches in town are the Sanctuary of the Madonna della Figura and San Silvestro Papa.

== People ==
- Alessio Giustini (born 1971), footballer
- Alfredo De Gasperis (1934–2013), Canadian businessman
- Anna Tatangelo (born 1987), singer and television personality
- Caesar Baronius (1538–1607), cardinal and ecclesiastical historian
- Davide Zappacosta (born 1992), footballer
- Filippo Iannone (born 1957), prelate of the Catholic Church
- Ginevra Francesconi (born 2003), actress and model
- Giulio Cesare Polerio (1555–1610), chess theoretician and player
- Enio Mora (1949–1996), Canadian gangster
- Enzo Di Pede
- Lucius Mummius (200–190 BC), Roman general and senator
- Luis Hasa (born 2004), footballer
- Mario Ferri (born 1948), Italian-Canadian community organizer, politician and activist
- Luca Brandolini (born 1933), Catholic bishop
- Ludovica Francesconi (born 1999), actress
- Ludovico Camangi (1903–1976), politician
- Quintus Valerius Soranus (c. 140–130 BC, 82 BC), Latin poet and inventor of the table of contents
- Stefano Pescosolido (born 1971), Italian tennis player
- Suranus (died c. 580), abbot in Umbria
- Tony Evangelista (born 1945), Canadian soccer referee
- Vittorio Cristini (1928–1974), Italian professional football player
- Vittorio De Sica (1901–1974), film director and actor
- Zappacosta (born 1953), Canadian–Italian musician

== Twin towns ==
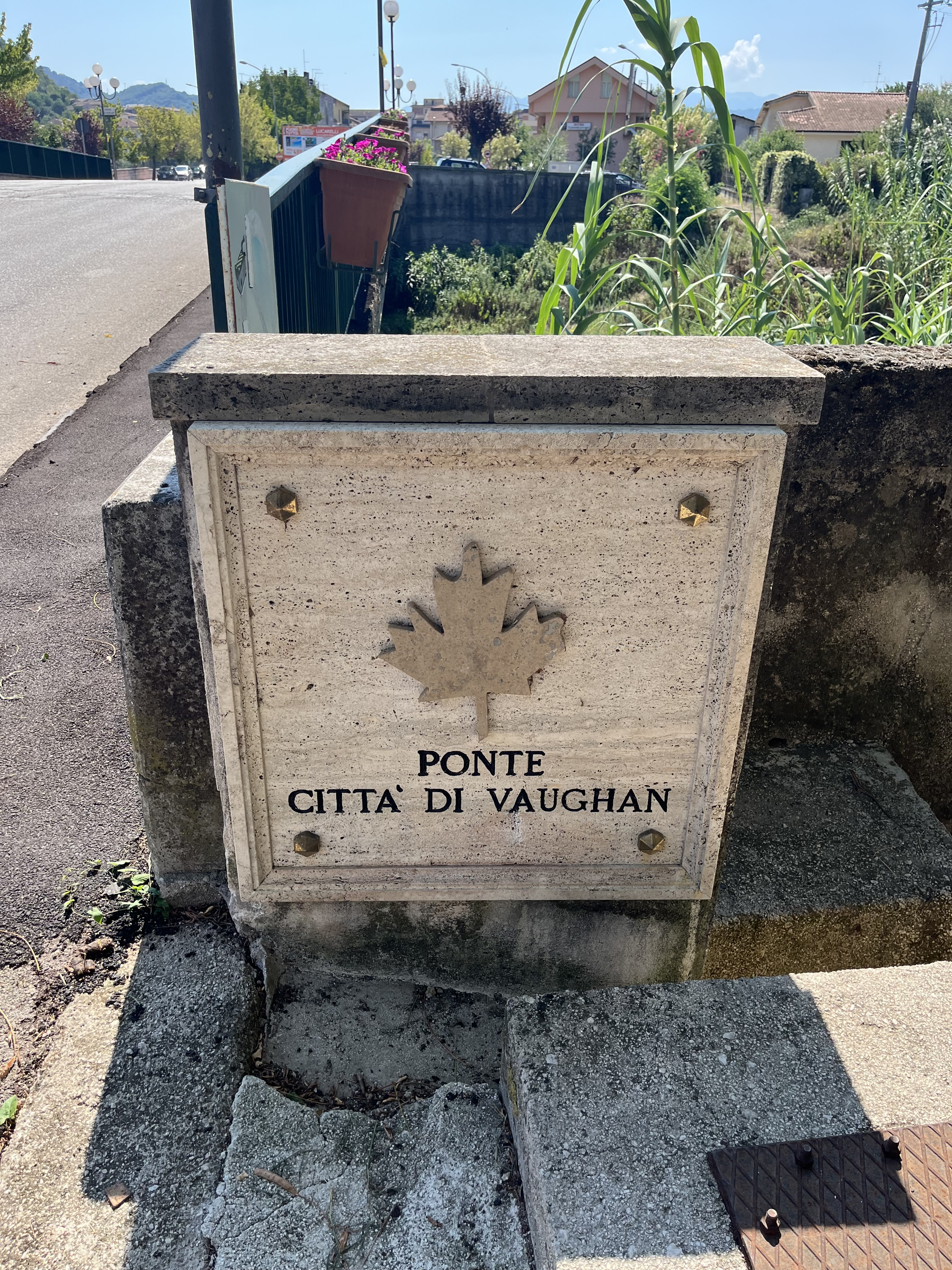
Bridge in Sora, Lazio named after its twin city, Vaughan, Ontario

- Vaughan, Canada
- Athis-Mons, France
