= Ludovico Costa =

Italian painter

Ludovico Costa (active 1648–1657) was an Italian painter, active mainly in his native Soncino and nearby towns. He may have trained in Cremona.

== Biography ==
He painted for the church of Santa Maria Assunta and San Giacomo of Soncino, for the parish church of Fontanella, as well as in some private homes. His Virgin and Two Saints is found in San Domenico, Orzinuovi.
