= Ludovico Gonzaga =

Ludovico Gonzaga (also spelled Lodovico) was the name of several prominent members of the House of Gonzaga:

- Ludovico I Gonzaga (1268–1360), better known as Luigi, the first Capitano del Popolo ('Captain of the People') of Mantua and Imperial Vicar
- Ludovico II Gonzaga (1334–1382), Italian politician who was capitano del popolo of Mantua
- Ludovico III Gonzaga (1412–1478), also known as Ludovico II, Marquis of Mantua from 1444
- Ludovico Gonzaga (1480-1540) (c. 1480–1540), Italian nobleman and condottiero
- Ludovico Gonzaga-Nevers, also known as Luigi and Louis (1539–1595), Duke of Nevers from 1565
- Ludovico Gonzaga (bishop) (1588–1632), Italian Roman Catholic bishop
