= Ludovico de Torres =

Ludovico de Torres may refer to:

- Ludovico de Torres (cardinal) (1552–1609), Roman Catholic cardinal
- Ludovico de Torres (bishop, born 1533) (1533–1583), Roman Catholic archbishop
