= Ludovico Camangi =

Italian politician

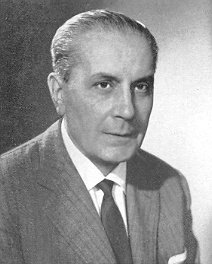
Ludovico Camangi

Ludovico Camangi (14 February 1903, Sora, Lazio – 2 September 1976) was an Italian politician. He represented the Italian Republican Party in the Constituent Assembly of Italy from 1946 to 1948 and in the Chamber of Deputies from 1948 to 1968.
