= Sanctuary of the Madonna della Figura, Sora =

Church in Lazio, Italy

Coordinates: 41°43′28.9″N 13°33′46.5″E

The Sanctuary of the Madonna della Figura or Santuario di Santa Maria della Figura is a Roman Catholic church located in the town of Sora, region of Lazio, Italy.

== History ==
The sanctuary was built circa 1700s near a grotto where a venerated fresco image of the Virgin and Child was located. Since construction it has undergone a number of reconstructions. The initial layout consisted of three naves. The present chapels and bell tower were added in 1937. The ceiling is frescoed with the Holy Trinity, Virgin, and four evangelists. Behind the main altar is the detached venerated fresco image.
