= Lodovico Campalastro =

Italian painter

Lodovico Campalastro was an Italian painter, born and active in Ferrara, where he painted a Nativity, a Repose in Egypt, and an Adoration of the Magi for the church of San Crispin, while for the church of San Lorenzo, he painted a St. Francis of Assisi.
