= Castiglion Fiorentino =

- Comune
- Città di Castiglion Fiorentino
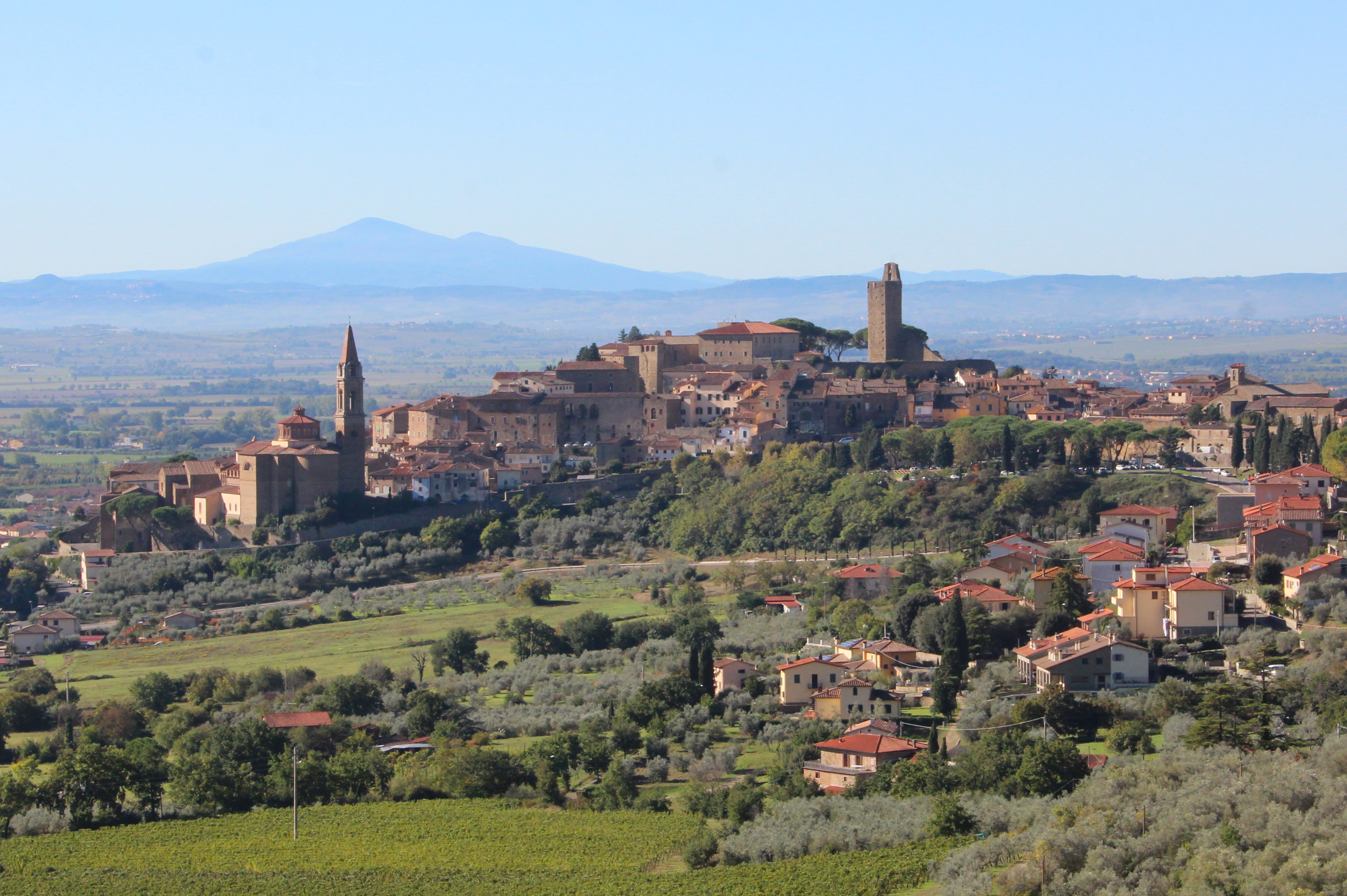
- The valley below Castiglion Fiorentino

- Coat of arms

- Location within Italy Location within Tuscany
- Coordinates: 43°20′38″N 11°55′8″E
- Country: Italy
- Region: Tuscany
- Province: Arezzo (AR)
- Frazioni: Brolio, Castroncello, Cozzano, La Badia, La Nave, Mammi, Manciano La Misericordia, Montecchio Vesponi, Noceta, Orzale, Pergognano, Petreto, Pieve di Chio, Pievuccia, Ranchetto, Ristonchia, Santa Cristina, Santa Lucia, Santa Margherita, Senaia.

Government
  - Mayor: Mario Agnelli (elected 26 May 2014)

Area
  - Total: 113.19 km^{2} (43.70 sq mi)
- Elevation: 342 m (1,122 ft)

Population (3O June 2017)
  - Total: 13,195
  - Density: 116.57/km^{2} (301.93/sq mi)
- Demonym: Castiglionesi
- Time zone: UTC+1 (CET)
  - Summer (DST): UTC+2 (CEST)
- Postal code: 52043
- Dialing code: 0575
- Patron saint: Saint Michael the Archangel
- Saint day: 8 May
- Website: Official website

The Loggia by Vasari at the Piazza del Municipio Castiglion Fiorentino

Castiglion Fiorentino (Italian pronunciation: [kastiʎˈʎoɱ fjorenˈtiːno]) is a small, walled city in eastern Tuscany, Italy, in the province of Arezzo, between the cities of Arezzo and Cortona. It is known for its annual festivals and its Etruscan archeological site.

== History ==
Due to the overall infrastructure, town walls, and building architecture, for many years scholars considered the town to have been established in the late medieval time frame. More recent excavations, however, have found the remains of an Etruscan city wall (c. 4th century BC) underneath the current Piazzale del Cassero, and have discovered the remains of an Etruscan temple under one of the town's churches, la chiesa di Sant'Angelo, which was built in the 12th century.

Documents from the 10th century mention a town named "Castiglione" in the feudal property of the Marquis of Monte Santa Maria. During the following century, the town became a part of the Diocese of Arezzo. From the 12th century the town was a free commune, until 1289 when, in the wake of the Battle of Campaldino, it became part of the Republic of Florence. Arezzo and Siena joined forces against the Florentines in later years and reconquered Castiglione Aretino (as it was known then), which was then fortified under the direction of Bishop Guido Tarlati, Lord of Arezzo. Following Tarlati's death in 1336, Florence again gained control of Castiglione, until 1344, when it was acquired by Perugia, and renamed Castiglione Perugino. In 1369, the townspeople revolted against the Perugians, giving themselves to the Papal States; by 1384 the Florentines seized the town and bestowed its current name, Castiglione Fiorentino.

During the 15th century, Castiglion Fiorentino suffered from repeated outbreaks of the plague, blamed at the time on the marshy areas surrounding the city. At the dawn of the 16th century, the Sienese army, led by Pietro Strozzi, gained control of the area, holding Castiglion Fiorentino until 1554, when the area became part of the Grand Duchy of Tuscany. For the next two hundred years, the Medici Grand Dukes ruled the city, until in 1765 the House of Lorraine gained power. The new dynasty encouraged the reclamation of marshlands, leading to a period of economic and population growth for Castiglion Fiorentino.

From 1800 to 1814, the town was garrisoned by Napoleon's troops. After the Congress of Vienna in 1815, the town was returned to Tuscany, to which it remained until 1861, when the Grand Duchy was annexed to the newly created Kingdom of Italy. Military activity during World War II damaged part of the town center as well as much of the surrounding countryside.

== Geography ==
Castiglion Fiorentino lies at the centre of a triangle formed by the cities of Florence, Siena, and Perugia. Situated on a hilltop, 345 metres (1,132 ft) above sea level, the town overlooks the Val di Chio and the Preappenines. Slightly more than 13,000 people live in the city (2013). The village of Manciano, known locally as "Misericordia", lies a 1.6 kilometres (0.99 miles) to the west.

== Economy ==
Much of the town's economy is based on agricultural and cattle ranching. Other residents are employed at pasta factories, sausage factories, and sugarhouses. Some artisans create ceramics, and an additional 27% of the town's workers are employed by the service industry.

== Culture ==
Castiglion Fiorentino also has many festivals throughout the year including the famous "Palio dei Rioni" on the third Sunday of June. Similar to the festival in Siena, the Palio dei Rioni is a horse race around Piazza Garibaldi, including a colourful and energetic display of the ancient custom of flag-waving, which dates back to the 13th century. During the week leading up to Easter Sunday, the parade along the city's streets, re-enacting a scene from the Passion as they have done annually for the past four hundred years.

== Main sights ==
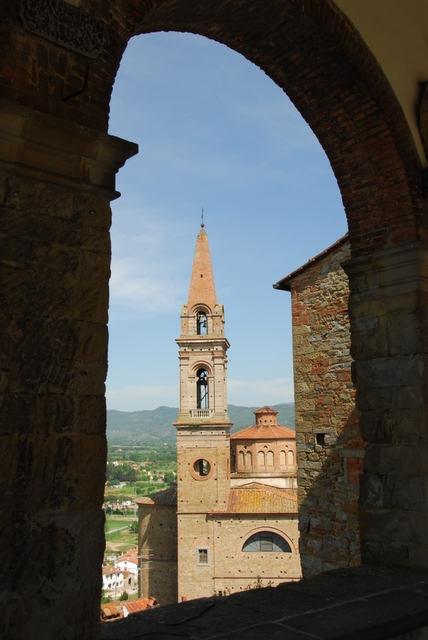
Views from Castiglion Fiorentino.

The first of the existing city walls, including Porta Fiorentina, the main entrance to the town's historical center, was erected in the 13th century, then enlarged in the 14th under the Perugians to connect the castle to the outside walls. An anti-gate containing the Medici coat of arms is located outside of the walls, while the inside of the gate is constructed of three arches under a statue of the town's patron saint, St. Michael. The town's fortress, the Cassero, was completed in 1367. In the 15th century, the nuns of San Girolamo used the fortress as a convent, and by the 19th century much of the fortress had been destroyed, with the remaining structure used as a prison.

The Pinacoteca, or Municipal Art Gallery, occupies the former church of Sant'Angelo. Built on the site of an Etruscan temple, the church of Sant'Angelo was built in Romanesque style between 1229 and 1239. The church has served as a hospital, wine cellar, and workshop before being renovated and used as an official museum and art gallery.

In 1513, Vasari constructed a nine arch loggia (Logge del Vasari) in Piazza del Comune, overlooking the valley. The Logge were restored once between 1560 and 1570 and then again in the first part of the 20th century.

Nearby is the Castello di Montecchio, which once was given to the British mercenary John Hawkwood.

== Education ==
Young children are educated at a school within the town. Older children attend secondary school in Arezzo.

In June, 1989, Texas A&M University opened the Santa Chiara Study Center in Castiglion Fiorentino. Approximately 100 students from Texas A&M and other American universities, including Texas Tech University, University of Texas at Austin, Cal Poly Pomona, Colorado State University, University of Houston, and Kansas State University, studied at Santa Chiara each semester, studying landscape architecture, art, architecture, literature, horticulture, music, and international business. The Santa Chiara center is named after the building in which it is found, which is a former convent of the Order of Poor Clares. The building still contains the Church of Saint Clare (Santa Chiara in Italian), although it is now considered to be structurally unsound and is not used. Found on the southeast edge of town, the building has also been used as a girl's academy, but was vacant when Texas A&M began to use the building which is operated by the Italart Cultural Association. The city of Castiglion Fiorentino owns and restored the building. Texas A&M also sends some of its rising freshmen every summer, all of which are national scholars (National Merit Finalists and National Hispanic Scholars) for a two and a half week trip named the Memorial Student Center Conway-Fitzhugh International Honors Leadership Seminar in collaboration with the LAUNCH office at Texas A&M University, College Station (formerly the Agricultural and Mechanical College of Texas) .

== Notable people ==
- Roberto Benigni, actor and director was born in Manciano La Misericordia
- Fabrizio Meoni, off-road and Rallying motorcycle racer

== Sister cities ==
- Ronda, Spain
