= Luigi (given name) =

- Pronunciation: Italian: [luˈiːdʒi]
- Gender: Male

Origin
- Origin: Ludwig (Chlodwig)
- Meaning: renowned/famous warrior
- Region of origin: Italy

Other names
- Related names: Luigino, Louis, Lewis, Levi, Ludvik, Aloysius, Luis

Luigi is a masculine Italian given name. It is the Italian form of the German name Ludwig, through the Latinization Ludovicus, corresponding to the French name Louis and its anglicized variant Lewis.

Other forms of the same name in Italian are the names Ludovico, Clodoveo, Aloísio, and Alvise, the last form being more frequent in the Veneto region. A derived feminine name is Luigina.

== People with the given name Luigi ==
=== Crime and law ===
- Luigi Chiatti (born 1968), serial killer
- Luigi de Magistris (politician) (born 1967), prosecutor
- Luigi Ferrari Bravo (1933–2016), jurist
- Luigi Giuliano (born 1949), Camorrista of the Giuliano clan
- Luigi Lucheni (1873–1910), anarchist and assassin
- Luigi Mangione (born 1998), killer of UnitedHealthcare CEO Brian Thompson
- Luigi Manocchio (1927–2024), Italian-American mobster
- Luigi Riccio (born 1957), pentito and former Camorrista
- Luigi Scotti (born 1932), judge
- Luigi Vollaro, Camorrista of the Vollaro clan

=== Engineering and mathematics ===
- Luigi Bianchi (1856–1928), mathematician
- Luigi Colani (1928–2019), German industrial designer
- Luigi Cremona (1830–1903), mathematician
- Luigi Dadda (1923–2012), computer engineer
- Luigi Fantappiè (1901–1956), mathematician
- Luigi Giura (1795–1865), Italian engineer and architect
- Luigi Martinelli (engineer), Italian aeronautical engineer, mechanical engineer, and professor
- Luigi Poletti (mathematician) (1864–1967), mathematician and poet
- Luigi Segre (1919–1963), automotive designer and engineer
- Luigi Vanvitelli (1700–1773), engineer and architect

=== Film and television ===
- Luigi Almirante (1886–1963), film actor
- Luigi Batzella, Z-movie director
- Luigi Bonos (1910–2000), film actor
- Luigi Capuano (1904–1979), film director and screenwriter
- Luigi Cimara (1891–1962), film actor
- Luigi Comencini (1916–2007), film director
- Luigi Cozzi (born 1947), movie director and screenwriter
- Luigi Filippo D'Amico (1924–2007), director and writer
- Luigi Gervasi, set decorator from 1947–68
- Luigi Lo Cascio (born 1967), actor
- Luigi Magni (1928–2013), screenwriter and film director
- Luigi Pane (born 1977), director and video artist
- Luigi Pavese (1896–1969), film actor
- Luigi Petrucci (born 1956), film and television actor
- Luigi Pistilli (1929–1996), actor of stage, screen, and television
- Luigi Scaccianoce (1914–1981), production designer, art director, and set decorator
- Luigi Zampa (1905–1991), film-maker

=== Journalism and literature ===
- Luigi Alamanni (1495–1556), poet and statesman
- Luigi Albertini (1871–1941), journalist and antifascist
- Luigi Ballerini (born 1940), poet, professor, and historian of gastronomy
- Luigi Bartolini (1892–1963), writer, poet, and painter
- Luigi Barzini, Jr. (1908–1984), Italian-American journalist
- Luigi Barzini, Sr. (1874–1947), journalist, war correspondent, and writer
- Luigi Capuana (1839–1915), author, journalist, and member of the Verist movement
- Luigi Chiarelli (1880–1947), playwright, theatre critic, and writer of short stories
- Luigi Da Porto (1485–1529), writer and storiographer
- Luigi Fabbri (1877–1935), anarchist, writer, agitator, and propagandist
- Luigi Fontanella (born 1943), poet, critic, translator, playwright, and novelist
- Luigi Freddi (1895–1977), journalist and politician
- Luigi Malerba (1927–2008), author and co-founder of the Gruppo 63
- Luigi Meneghello (1922–2007), contemporary writer and scholar
- Luigi Pirandello (1867–1936), writer
- Luigi Pulci (1432–1484), poet best known for Morgante
- Luigi Tansillo (1510–1568), poet of the Petrarchian and Marinist schools
- Luigi Ugolini (1891–1980), writer

=== Military, nobility, and politics ===
- Luigi Alidosi (died 1430), lord of Imola from 1391 to 1424
- Prince Luigi Amedeo, Duke of the Abruzzi (1873–1933), Italian prince, mountaineer, and explorer
- Luigi Antonini (1883–1968), American trade union leader
- Luigi Arisio (1926–2020), Italian politician
- Luigi Berlinguer (1932–2023), Italian politician
- Luigi Bertoldi (1920–2001), Italian politician
- Luigi Braschi Onesti (before 1787–1816), nephew of Pope Pius VI
- Luigi Cacciatore (1900–1951), Italian politician
- Luigi Cadorna (1850–1928), Italian general and marshal
- Luigi Capello (1859–1941), Italian general
- Luigi Castagnola (politician) (born 1936), Italian politician
- Luigi Cocilovo (born 1947), member of the European Parliament and university researcher in law
- Luigi Cornaro (1464–1566), Venetian nobleman
- Luigi, Count Cibrario (1802–1870), statesman and historian
- Luigi dal Verme (?–1449), condottiero
- Luigi Durand de la Penne (1914–1992), naval diver during World War II
- Luigi Einaudi (1874–1961), politician and economist
- Luigi R. Einaudi, U.S. career diplomat
- Luigi Facta (1861–1930), politician and journalist
- Luigi Carlo Farini (1812–1866), Italian physician, statesman, and historian
- Luigi Federzoni (1878–1967), nationalist and later Fascist politician
- Luigi Ferdinando Marsigli (1658–1730), soldier and naturalist
- Luigi Frusci (1879–1949), Royal Army officer during World War II
- Luigi Gorrini (1917–2014), Italian fighter pilot during World War II
- Luigi Granelli (1929–1999), Italian politician
- Luigi Gui (1914–2010), politician and philosopher
- Luigi Lonfernini (born 1938), Captain Regent of San Marino in 1971 and 2001
- Luigi Longo (1900–1980), Italian communist politician and secretary of the Italian Communist Party
- Luigi Luzzatti (1841–1927), politician, Prime Minister of Italy between 1910 and 1911
- Luigi Mazzella (born 1932), Italian jurist and politician
- Luigi Miceli (1824–1906), patriot, politician, and military figure
- Luigi Mocenigo (disambiguation), multiple people
- Luigi Nocera (1955–2025), Italian politician
- Luigi Palma di Cesnola (1832–1904), Italian-American soldier and amateur archaeologist
- Luigi Pantisano (born 1979), German politician
- Luigi Parrilli, aristocrat
- Luigi Pelloux (1839–1924), general and politician
- Luigi Perenni (1913–1943), military officer and skier
- Luigi Razza (1892–1935), Italian journalist and politician
- Luigi Rava (1860–1938), Italian politician
- Luigi Rizzo (1887–1951), naval officer and torpedo boat commander
- Luigi Settembrini (1813–1877), Neapolitan man of letters and politician
- Luigi Spaventa (1934–2013), Italian academic and politician
- Luigi Viviani (born 1937), Italian politician
- Luigi Viviani (soldier) (1903–1943), Italian engineer and soldier

=== Music ===
- Luigi Alva (1927–2025), Peruvian opera singer
- Luigi Antinori (c. 1697–?), tenor
- Luigi Arditi (1822–1903), violinist, composer, and conductor
- Luigi Attademo (born 1972), classical guitarist
- Luigi Bassi (1766–1825), operatic baritone
- Luigi Boccherini (1743–1805), cellist and composer
- Luigi Cherubini (1760–1842), Italian-born composer
- Luigi Creatore (1921–2015), American songwriter and record producer
- Luigi Dallapiccola (1904–1975), composer known for lyrical twelve-tone compositions
- Ivan Della Mea (born as Luigi), singer-songwriter
- Luigi Denza (1846–1922), composer
- Luigi Gatti (composer) (1740–1817), classical composer
- Luigi Groto (1541–1585), Italian poet, lutenist, and actor
- Luigi Illica (1857–1919), librettist
- Luigi Infantino (1921–1991), operatic tenor
- Luigi Lablache (1794–1858), bass singer of French and Irish heritage
- Luigi Legnani (1790–1877), guitarist and composer
- Luigi Marchesi (1754–1829), castrato singer
- Luigi Marini (1885–1942), Italian lyric tenor
- Luigi Morleo (born 1970), percussionist and composer of contemporary music
- Luigi Negri (disambiguation), multiple people
- Luigi Nono (1924–1990), avant-garde composer of classical music
- Luigi Piazza (1884–1967), operatic baritone
- Luigi Piccioli (1812–1862), musician, singer, voice instructor, and professor
- Luigi Ricci (vocal coach) (1893–1981), assistant conductor, accompanist, vocal coach, and author
- Luigi Ricci (composer) (1805–1859), composer, particularly of operas
- Luigi Ricci-Stolz (1852–1906), musician and composer
- Luigi Rossi (1597–1653), Baroque composer
- Luigi Russolo, composer
- Luigi Antonio Sabbatini (1732–1809), Italian composer and music theorist
- Luigi Sagrati (1921–2008), violinist
- Luigi Tarisio (c. 1790–1854), violin dealer and collector
- Luigi Tenco (1938–1967), singer, songwriter, and actor
- Luigi Verderame, Belgian singer usually known just as Luigi
- Luigi von Kunits (1870–1931), Austrian conductor, composer, violinist, and pedagogue
- Luigi Waites (1927–2010), American jazz drummer and vibraphonist
- Luigi Zamboni (1767–1837), operatic buffo bass-baritone
- Luigi Zenobi (1540s – after 1602), virtuoso cornett player

=== Religion ===
- Luigi Amat di San Filippo e Sorso (1796–1878), dean of the College of Cardinals
- Luigi Bilio (1826–1884), Cardinal of the Roman Catholic Church
- Luigi Bonazzi (1948–2025), Roman Catholic apostolic nuncio
- Luigi Capotosti (1863–1938), Cardinal of the Roman Catholic Church
- Luigi Ciacchi (1788–1865), Cardinal of the Catholic Church
- Luigi Ciotti (born 1945), Roman Catholic priest
- Luigi Dadaglio (1914–1990), Roman Catholic Cardinal and Major Penitentiary of the Apostolic Penitentiary
- Luigi "Ossian" D'Ambrosio (born 1970), modern Druid, musician and jeweler
- Luigi De Magistris (cardinal) (1926–2022), Roman Catholic Archbishop
- Luigi d'Este (1538–1586), Italian cardinal
- Luigi Fortis (1748–1829), Jesuit
- Luigi Giussani (1922–2005), Catholic priest, educator, and public intellectual
- Luigi Guanella (1842–1912), Catholic priest from Northern Italy
- Luigi Jacobini (1832–1887), Cardinal of the Roman Catholic Church
- Luigi Lambruschini (1776–1854), Cardinal of the Roman Catholic Church
- Luigi Lavitrano (1874–1950), Cardinal of the Roman Catholic Church
- Luigi Lippomano (1500–1559), cardinal and hagiographer
- Luigi Locati (1928–2005), Catholic missionary and bishop
- Luigi Macchi (1832–1907), Catholic nobleman and Cardinal
- Luigi Maglione (1877–1944), Cardinal of the Roman Catholic Church
- Luigi Mascolo, priest who defected to the Brazilian Catholic Apostolic Church
- Luigi Mozzi (1746–1813), Jesuit controversialist
- Luigi Oreglia di Santo Stefano (1828–1913), Cardinal of the Catholic Church
- Luigi Orione (1872–1940), saint
- Luigi Poggi (1917–2010), Cardinal of the Roman Catholic Church
- Luigi Raimondi (1912–1975), Cardinal of the Roman Catholic Church
- Luigi Sincero (1870–1936), Roman Catholic Cardinal
- Luigi Sturzo (1871–1959), Catholic priest and politician
- Luigi Taparelli (1793–1862), Catholic scholar of the Society of Jesus
- Luigi Traglia (1895–1977), Cardinal of the Roman Catholic Church
- Luigi Tripepi (1836–1906), Roman Catholic cardinal and poet

=== Science ===
- Luigi Aloysius Colla (1766–1848), botanist
- Luigi Amoroso (1886–1965), neoclassical economist
- Luigi Bellardi (1859–1889), malacologist and entomologist
- Luigi Bodio (1840–1920), economist and statistician
- Luigi Cagnola (1762–1833), architect
- Luigi Canina (1795–1856), archaeologist and architect
- Luigi Carnera (1875–1962), astronomer
- Luigi Cossa (1831–1896), economist
- Luigi di Bella (1912–2003), medical doctor and physiology professor
- Luigi Ferri (1826–1895), philosopher
- Luigi Frati (born 1943), academic physician and rector of the Sapienza University of Rome
- Luigi Gaetano Marini (1742–1815), natural philosopher, jurist, historian, and archeologist
- Luigi Galvani (1737–1798), physician and physicist
- Luigi Guido Grandi (1671–1742), philosopher and mathematician
- Luigi Hugues (1836–1913), academic geographer and amateur musician
- Luigi Luca Cavalli-Sforza (1922–2018), population geneticist
- Luigi Maria Ugolini (1895–1936), archaeologist
- Luigi Palmieri (1807–1896), physicist and meteorologist
- Luigi Pareyson (1918–1991), philosopher
- Luigi Pasinetti (1930–2023), economist of the Post-Keynesians school
- Luigi Pernier (1874–1937), archaeologist and academic
- Luigi Piccinato (1899–1983), architect and town planner
- Luigi Pigorini (1842–1925), palaeoethnologist, archaeologist, and ethnographer
- Luigi Poletti (architect) (1792–1869), neoclassical architect
- Luigi Rosselli, Italian/Australian practicing architect
- Luigi Rizzi (linguist) (born 1952), linguist
- Luigi Rolando (1773–1831), anatomist
- Luigi Salvatorelli (1886–1974), historian and publicist
- Luigi Snozzi (1932–2020), Swiss architect
- Luigi Tosti (1811–1897), Benedictine historian
- Luigi Zoja (born 1943), psychoanalyst and writer

=== Sports ===
- Luigi "Geno" Auriemma (born 1954), Italian-born American women's basketball coach

==== Football ====
- Luigi Agnolin (1943–2018), football referee
- Luigi Allemandi (1903–1978), football defender
- Luigi Anaclerio (born 1981), football striker
- Luigi Apolloni (born 1967), football manager and former player
- Luigi Barbesino (1894–1941), footballer and manager from Casale Monferrato
- Luigi Beghetto (born 1973), football striker
- Luigi Bertolini (1904–1977), football midfielder
- Luigi Bruins (born 1987), Dutch football midfielder
- Luigi Brunella (1914–1993), football manager and former defender
- Luigi Burlando (1899–1967), football midfielder
- Luigi Cagni (born 1950), football manager and former player
- Luigi Cevenini (1895–1968), football player
- Luigi De Agostini (born 1961), football defender
- Luigi De Canio (born 1957), football manager and former player
- Luigi Della Rocca (born 1984), football striker
- Luigi Delneri (born 1950), football manager and former player
- Luigi Di Biagio (born 1971), football defensive midfielder
- Luigi Ferrero (1904–1984), football manager and former player
- Luigi Garzja (born 1979), football player
- Luigi Giuliano (footballer) (1930–1993), football player
- Luigi Glombard (born 1984), football striker
- Luigi Grassi (born 1983), football midfielder
- Luigi Griffanti (1917–2006), football player
- Luigi Lavecchia (born 1981), football defender/midfielder
- Luigi Maifredi (born 1947), football manager
- Luigi Martinelli (footballer) (born 1970), football defender
- Luigi Perversi (1906–1991), football defender
- Luigi Piangerelli (born 1973), football midfielder
- Luigi Pieroni (born 1980), Belgian football striker
- Luigi Radice (1935–2018), football coach and former player
- Luigi Riccio (footballer) (born 1977), football midfielder
- Luigi Riva (1944–2024), football forward
- Luigi Sala (born 1974), football defender
- Luigi Sartor (born 1975), football defender
- Luigi Scarabello (1916–2007), football player
- Luigi Sepe (born 1991), football goalkeeper
- Luigi Simoni (1939–2020), football manager and former player
- Luigi Turci (born 1970), football goalkeeper
- Luigi Vitale (born 1987), football wingback

==== Racing ====
- Luigi Arcangeli (1902–1931), motorcycle racer and race car driver
- Luigi Arienti (1937–2024), racing cyclist
- Luigi Cavalieri (1914–1992), bobsledder
- Luigi Cecchini (born 1944), sports doctor, active in road bicycle racing
- Luigi Chinetti (1901–1994), Italian-born racecar driver
- Luigi de Bettin, bobsledder
- Luigi De Manincor (1910–1986), sailor
- Luigi Fagioli (1898–1952), motor racing driver
- Luigi Figoli, bobsledder
- Luigi Ganna (1883–1957), road racing cyclist
- Luigi Giacobbe (1907–1995), cyclist who raced from 1926 to 1937
- Luigi Lucotti (1893–1980), road bicycle racer
- Luigi Marchisio (1909–1992), road racing cyclist
- Luigi Marfut (1904–1980), boxer
- Luigi Musso (1924–1958), racing driver
- Luigi Piotti (1913–1971), racing driver
- Luigi Poggi (sailor) (1906–1972), sailor
- Luigi Taramazzo (1932–2004), racing driver
- Luigi Taveri (1929–2018), Swiss motorcycle road racer
- Luigi Villoresi (1909–1997), Grand Prix motor racing driver

==== Other ====
- Luigi Beccali (1907–1990), athlete, Olympic winner of 1500 metres
- Luigi Bosatra (1905–1981), track and field athlete who competed in racewalking
- Luigi Cambiaso (1895–1975), gymnast
- Luigi Cantone (1917–1997), fencer
- Luigi Castiglione (born 1967), boxer
- Luigi Contessi (1894–1967), gymnast
- Luigi Costigliolo (1892–1939), gymnast
- Luigi Datome (born 1987), basketball player
- Luigi Fioravanti (born 1981), American mixed martial artist
- Luigi Gaudiano (born 1965), boxer
- Luigi Guido (born 1968), judoka
- Luigi Maiocco (1892–1965), gymnast
- Luigi Mannelli (1939–2017), water polo player
- Luigi Mastrangelo (born 1975), volleyball player
- Luigi Rovati (1904–1989), boxer
- Luigi Samele (born 1987), Italian Olympic sabre fencer
- Luigi Tarantino (born 1972), fencer
- Luigi Troiani (born 1964), rugby player
- Luigi Ulivelli (1935–2010), long jumper
- Luigi Weiss (born 1951), ski mountaineer and biathlete

=== Visual arts ===
- Luigi Acquisti (1745–1823), sculptor
- Luigi Anichini, engraver of seals and medals
- Luigi Basiletti (1780–1860), painter
- Luigi Benfatto (1551–1611), late-Renaissance painter
- Luigi Boccherini (1743–1805), classical era composer and cellist
- Luigi Borgomainerio, engraver and caricaturist
- Luigi Calamatta (1801–1868), painter and engraver
- Luigi Crosio (1835–1915), Turin-based Italian painter
- Luigi De Giudici (1887–1955), painter
- Luigi Diamante (1904–1971), painter
- Luigi Fontana (1827–1908), sculptor, painter, and architect
- Luigi Frisoni (1760–1811), painter
- Luigi Ghirri (1943–1992), photographer
- Luigi Garzi (1638–1721), Baroque painter
- Luigi Guardigli (1923–2008), painter and mosaicist
- Luigi Kasimir (1881–1962), Austro-Hungarian-born etcher, painter, printmaker, and landscape artist
- Luigi Lanzi (1732–1810), art historian and archaeologist
- Luigi Lucioni (1900–1988), Italian-born American painter
- Luigi Malice (born 1937), artist
- Luigi Manini (1848–1936), European set designer and architect
- Luigi Mascelli (1804–1825), Italian goldsmith
- Luigi Melchiorre (1859 – c. 1908), Italian sculptor
- Luigi Miradori (1600s – c. 1656), Baroque painter
- Luigi Mussini (1813–1888), painter
- Luigi Nono (painter) (1850–1918), Italian painter
- Luigi Pellegrini Scaramuccia (1616–1680), Baroque painter and artist biographer
- Luigi Primo (c. 1605–1667), Flemish Baroque painter
- Luigi Quaini (1643–1717), Baroque painter
- Luigi Rados (1773–1840), engraver
- Luigi Riccardi (1807–1877), painter
- Luigi Russolo (1885–1947), Futurist painter and composer
- Luigi Sabatelli (1772–1850), Neoclassical painter
- Luigi Schiavonetti (1765–1810), reproductive engraver and etcher
- Luigi Serafini (artist) (born 1946), artist, architect, and designer
- Luigi Trinchero (1862–1944), sculptor

=== Other fields ===
- Luigi Bertoni (1872–1947), Italian-born anarchist writer and typographer
- Luigi Borrelli, Naples-based shirts maker
- Luigi Calabresi (1937–1972), commissioner of Italian police in Milan
- Luigi Carrel (1901–1983), mountain climber, mountain guide, and ski mountaineer
- Luigi D'Albertis (1841–1901), naturalist and explorer
- Luigi Galleani (1861–1931), anarchist
- Luigi Lavazza (1859–1949), businessman
- Luigi Manzotti (1835–1905), choreographer
- Luigi Ossoinack (1849–1904), Hungarian businessman and politician
- Luigi Puccianti (1875–1952), Italian physicist
- Luigi Veronelli (1926–2004), gastronome and intellectual
- Luigi Villa, backgammon player
- Luigi Voltan, the founder of the eponymous shoe company

=== Fictional characters ===
- Luigi (Cars), a Fiat 500 car from Pixar's animated film franchise
- Luigi (character), a Nintendo video game character and the younger twin brother of Mario from the Super Mario franchise
- Luigi Risotto, from the animated sitcom The Simpsons
- Luigi Vendetta, in Kick Buttowski

== See also ==
- Luigi (jazz dancer), stage name of Eugene Louis Faccuito (1925–2015), American jazz dancer, choreographer, and teacher
- Louis (name)
- Luigia
- Luigina
- Luigino
