= List of presidents of the institutions of the European Union =

This is a list of presidents of the institutions of the European Union (EU). Each of the institutions is headed by a president or a presidency, with some being more prominent than others. Both the President of the European Council and the President of the European Commission are sometimes wrongly termed the President of the European Union. Most go back to 1957 but others, such as the President of the Auditors Court or of the European Central Bank, have been created recently. Currently (2026), the President of the European Commission is Ursula von der Leyen and the President of the European Council is António Costa.

== Current officeholders ==
President of the European Council
| António Costa | Institution | European Council | The duty of the European Council president is primarily that of preparing and chairing the meetings of the European Council. The position became 30-month appointed position, elected by the members of the European Council, in 2009 by virtue of the Treaty of Lisbon. Before, it rotated around between the head of state or government of the country holding the Presidency of the Council of the European Union (see below). This longer term President of the European Council has been described directly by some as a new "President of the European Union". According to the Financial Times, "the president would have few formal powers, but would give the EU strategic leadership and represent the bloc on the world stage on issues such as climate change, bilateral relations and development." |
| António Costa | Current holder | António Costa | |
| António Costa | Member State | Portugal | |
| António Costa | Party | Party of European Socialists | |
| António Costa | Since | 1 December 2024 | |
Presidency of the Council of the European Union
| | Institution | Council of the EU | The Presidency of the Council of the European Union (Council of Ministers) is rotated between member states every 6 months. The council is composed of the relevant national ministers depending on the topic being discussed with minister from the state holding the presidency chairing. The country holding the Presidency is able to affect the overall policy direction for the six months. Since 2007, the Presidency has been co-ordinated every 18 months by three countries (a "triplet"), though one still takes a lead position every 6 months. |
| | Current holder | Ireland | |
| | Head of Government | Micheál Martin | |
| | Party | Alliance of Liberals and Democrats for Europe Party | |
| | Since | 1 July 2026 | |
President of the European Commission
| Ursula von der Leyen | Institution | European Commission | The President of the European Commission is head of the 27-member college of commissioners. The commission's responsibilities include drafting legislative proposals and managing the day-to-day running of the EU. It is also responsible for a degree of the EU's external representation, for example attending G8 meetings. The commission president is proposed by the European Council, who take account of the previous European Elections, before being elected by the European Parliament for a five-year mandate. It has been described by some as the "President of the European Union" but a more common analogy is "Prime Minister of the European Union" given the style of position over a cabinet government. |
| Ursula von der Leyen | Current holder | Ursula von der Leyen | |
| Ursula von der Leyen | Member State | Germany | |
| Ursula von der Leyen | Party | European People's Party | |
| Ursula von der Leyen | Since | 1 December 2019 | |
President of the European Parliament
| Roberta Metsola | Institution | European Parliament | The President of the European Parliament presides over the plenary of the Parliament, which is one-half of the legislative branch of the Union. The President also chairs the Bureau and Conference of Presidents as well as representing the Parliament. The President's role is similar to that of a speaker in a national parliament, but also represents the Parliament externally and vis a vis the other institutions, which is a more political role. |
| Roberta Metsola | Current holder | Roberta Metsola | The President of the European Parliament presides over the plenary of the Parliament, which is one-half of the legislative branch of the Union. The President also chairs the Bureau and Conference of Presidents as well as representing the Parliament. The President's role is similar to that of a speaker in a national parliament, but also represents the Parliament externally and vis a vis the other institutions, which is a more political role. |
| Roberta Metsola | Member State | Malta | The President of the European Parliament presides over the plenary of the Parliament, which is one-half of the legislative branch of the Union. The President also chairs the Bureau and Conference of Presidents as well as representing the Parliament. The President's role is similar to that of a speaker in a national parliament, but also represents the Parliament externally and vis a vis the other institutions, which is a more political role. |
| Roberta Metsola | Party | European People's Party | The President of the European Parliament presides over the plenary of the Parliament, which is one-half of the legislative branch of the Union. The President also chairs the Bureau and Conference of Presidents as well as representing the Parliament. The President's role is similar to that of a speaker in a national parliament, but also represents the Parliament externally and vis a vis the other institutions, which is a more political role. |
| Roberta Metsola | Since | 11 January 2022 | The President of the European Parliament presides over the plenary of the Parliament, which is one-half of the legislative branch of the Union. The President also chairs the Bureau and Conference of Presidents as well as representing the Parliament. The President's role is similar to that of a speaker in a national parliament, but also represents the Parliament externally and vis a vis the other institutions, which is a more political role. |
President of the Court of Justice
| | Institution | Court of Justice of the European Union (Court of Justice) | The President of the Court of Justice is elected from and by the judges for a renewable term of three years. The President presides over hearings and deliberations, directing both judicial business and administration. The European Court of Justice is the highest court in the European Union in matters of European Union law. As a part of the Court of Justice of the European Union it is tasked with interpreting EU law and ensuring its equal application across all EU member states. The Court is based in Luxembourg and is composed of one judge per member state – currently 27 – although it normally hears cases in panels of three, five or thirteen judges. |
| | Current holder | Koen Lenaerts | |
| | Member State | Belgium | |
| | Party | None | |
| | Since | 8 October 2015 | |
President of the General Court
| | Institution | Court of Justice of the European Union (General Court) | The President of the General Court is elected from and by the judges for a renewable term of three years. The President presides over hearings and deliberations, directing both judicial business and administration. The General Court is the second (unofficially lower) court of the Court of Justice of the European Union. It is responsible for cases in the fields of environment and consumers, freedom to provide services, law on the EU institutions, trade marks and intellectual and industrial property, competition, state aid, agriculture, public health, EU external relations, economic policy and access to documents. The Court is based in Luxembourg and is composed of two judges from each EU member state. Cases are heard by the chambers of 5 or 3 judges, presidents of which are elected for a term of three years. Unlike the Court of Justice, the General Court does not have Advocates General, but similar tasks can occasionally be performed by a judge of the General Court. |
| | Current holder | Savvas Papasavvas | |
| | Member State | Cyprus | |
| | Party | None | |
| | Since | 16 September 2026 | |
President of the European Central Bank
| Christine Lagarde | Institution | European Central Bank | The President of the European Central Bank is the head of the European Central Bank (ECB), the institution responsible for the management of the euro and monetary policy in the Eurozone of the European Union. The President heads the executive board, governing council and general council of the ECB and represents the bank abroad, for example at the G20. The President is appointed by majority in the European Council, de facto by those who have adopted the euro, for an eight-year non-renewable term. The primary objective of the European Central Bank, as mandated in Article 2 of the Statute of the ECB, is to maintain price stability within the Eurozone. |
| Christine Lagarde | Current holder | Christine Lagarde | |
| Christine Lagarde | Member State | France | |
| Christine Lagarde | Party | European People's Party | |
| Christine Lagarde | Since | 1 November 2019 | |
President of the European Court of Auditors
| | Institution | European Court of Auditors | The duties of the President of the European Court of Auditors (which may be delegated) are to convene and chair the meetings of the Court, ensuring that decisions are implemented and the departments (and other activities) are soundly managed. Despite its name, the Court has no judicial functions. It is rather a professional external investigatory audit agency. The primary role of the court is to externally check if the budget of the European Union has been implemented correctly, in that EU funds have been spent legally and with sound management. |
| | Current holder | Tony Murphy | |
| | Member State | Ireland | |
| | Party | None | |
| | Since | 1 October 2022 | |

== Historic officeholders ==
| Conservative/Christian democrat | Socialist | Liberal/Centrist | Communist | Independent |

| Year | President of the European Commission | President of the European Council | President of the European Parliament | Presidency of the Council of the European Union | | President of the European Court of Justice |
|---|---|---|---|---|---|---|
| 1958 | 1: Walter Hallstein (I) | | 1: Robert Schuman | Belgium | | 1: André Donner |
| 1958 | 1: Walter Hallstein (I) | | 1: Robert Schuman | Belgium | | 1: André Donner |
| 1958 | 1: Walter Hallstein (I) | | 1: Robert Schuman | West Germany | | 1: André Donner |
| 1959 | 1: Walter Hallstein (I) | | 1: Robert Schuman | France | | 1: André Donner |
| 1959 | 1: Walter Hallstein (I) | | 1: Robert Schuman | Italy | | 1: André Donner |
| 1960 | 1: Walter Hallstein (I) | | 2: Hans Furler | Luxembourg | | 1: André Donner |
| 1960 | 1: Walter Hallstein (I) | | 2: Hans Furler | Netherlands | | 1: André Donner |
| 1961 | 1: Walter Hallstein (I) | | 2: Hans Furler | Belgium | | 1: André Donner |
| 1961 | 1: Walter Hallstein (I) | | 2: Hans Furler | West Germany | | 1: André Donner |
| 1962 | 1: Walter Hallstein (II) | | 3: Gaetano Martino | France | | 1: André Donner |
| 1962 | 1: Walter Hallstein (II) | | 3: Gaetano Martino | Italy | | 1: André Donner |
| 1963 | 1: Walter Hallstein (II) | | 3: Gaetano Martino | Luxembourg | | 1: André Donner |
| 1963 | 1: Walter Hallstein (II) | | 3: Gaetano Martino | Netherlands | | 1: André Donner |
| 1964 | 1: Walter Hallstein (II) | | 4: Jean Duvieusart | Belgium | | 2: Charles Léon Hammes |
| 1964 | 1: Walter Hallstein (II) | | 4: Jean Duvieusart | West Germany | | 2: Charles Léon Hammes |
| 1965 | 1: Walter Hallstein (II) | | 5: Victor Leemans | France | | 2: Charles Léon Hammes |
| 1965 | 1: Walter Hallstein (II) | | 5: Victor Leemans | Italy | | 2: Charles Léon Hammes |
| 1966 | 1: Walter Hallstein (II) | | 6: Alain Poher | Luxembourg | | 2: Charles Léon Hammes |
| 1966 | 1: Walter Hallstein (II) | | 6: Alain Poher | Netherlands | | 2: Charles Léon Hammes |
| 1967 | 1: Walter Hallstein (II) | | 6: Alain Poher | Belgium | | 3: Robert Lecourt |
| 1967 | 2: Jean Rey | | 6: Alain Poher | West Germany | | 3: Robert Lecourt |
| 1968 | 2: Jean Rey | | 6: Alain Poher | France | | 3: Robert Lecourt |
| 1968 | 2: Jean Rey | | 6: Alain Poher | Italy | | 3: Robert Lecourt |
| 1969 | 2: Jean Rey | | 7: Mario Scelba | Luxembourg | | 3: Robert Lecourt |
| 1969 | 2: Jean Rey | | 7: Mario Scelba | Netherlands | | 3: Robert Lecourt |
| 1970 | 2: Jean Rey | | 7: Mario Scelba | Belgium | | 3: Robert Lecourt |
| 1970 | 3: Franco Maria Malfatti | | 7: Mario Scelba | West Germany | | 3: Robert Lecourt |
| 1971 | 3: Franco Maria Malfatti | | 8: Walter Behrendt | France | | 3: Robert Lecourt |
| 1971 | 3: Franco Maria Malfatti | | 8: Walter Behrendt | Italy | | 3: Robert Lecourt |
| 1972 | 4: Sicco Mansholt | | 8: Walter Behrendt | Luxembourg | | 3: Robert Lecourt |
| 1972 | 4: Sicco Mansholt | | 8: Walter Behrendt | Netherlands | | 3: Robert Lecourt |
| 1973 | 5: François-Xavier Ortoli | | 9: Cornelis Berkhouwer | Belgium | | 3: Robert Lecourt |
| 1973 | 5: François-Xavier Ortoli | | 9: Cornelis Berkhouwer | Belgium | | 3: Robert Lecourt |
| 1973 | 5: François-Xavier Ortoli | | 9: Cornelis Berkhouwer | Denmark | | 3: Robert Lecourt |
| 1973 | 5: François-Xavier Ortoli | | 9: Cornelis Berkhouwer | Denmark | | 3: Robert Lecourt |
| 1974 | 5: François-Xavier Ortoli | | 9: Cornelis Berkhouwer | West Germany | | 3: Robert Lecourt |
| 1974 | 5: François-Xavier Ortoli | | 9: Cornelis Berkhouwer | France | | 3: Robert Lecourt |
| 1975 | 5: François-Xavier Ortoli | Liam Cosgrave | 10: Georges Spénale | Ireland | | 3: Robert Lecourt |
| 1975 | 5: François-Xavier Ortoli | Aldo Moro | 10: Georges Spénale | Italy | | 3: Robert Lecourt |
| 1976 | 5: François-Xavier Ortoli | Gaston Thorn | 10: Georges Spénale | Luxembourg | | 4: Hans Kutscher |
| 1976 | 5: François-Xavier Ortoli | Joop den Uyl | 10: Georges Spénale | Netherlands | | 4: Hans Kutscher |
| 1977 | 6: Roy Jenkins | James Callaghan | 11: Emilio Colombo | United Kingdom | | 4: Hans Kutscher |
| 1977 | 6: Roy Jenkins | Leo Tindemans | 11: Emilio Colombo | Belgium | | 4: Hans Kutscher |
| 1978 | 6: Roy Jenkins | Anker Jørgensen | 11: Emilio Colombo | Denmark | | 4: Hans Kutscher |
| 1978 | 6: Roy Jenkins | Helmut Schmidt | 11: Emilio Colombo | West Germany | | 4: Hans Kutscher |
| 1979 | 6: Roy Jenkins | Valéry Giscard d'Estaing | 11: Emilio Colombo | France | | 4: Hans Kutscher |
| 1979 | 6: Roy Jenkins | Jack Lynch | 1: Simone Veil | Ireland | | 4: Hans Kutscher |
| 1979 | 6: Roy Jenkins | Charles Haughey | 1: Simone Veil | Ireland | | 4: Hans Kutscher |
| 1980 | 6: Roy Jenkins | Francesco Cossiga | 1: Simone Veil | Italy | | 5: Josse Mertens de Wilmars |
| 1980 | 6: Roy Jenkins | Pierre Werner | 1: Simone Veil | Luxembourg | | 5: Josse Mertens de Wilmars |
| 1981 | 7: Gaston Thorn | Dries van Agt | 1: Simone Veil | Netherlands | | 5: Josse Mertens de Wilmars |
| 1981 | 7: Gaston Thorn | Margaret Thatcher | 1: Simone Veil | United Kingdom | | 5: Josse Mertens de Wilmars |
| 1982 | 7: Gaston Thorn | Wilfried Martens | 2: Piet Dankert | Belgium | | 5: Josse Mertens de Wilmars |
| 1982 | 7: Gaston Thorn | Anker Jørgensen | 2: Piet Dankert | Denmark | | 5: Josse Mertens de Wilmars |
| 1982 | 7: Gaston Thorn | Poul Schlüter | 2: Piet Dankert | Denmark | | 5: Josse Mertens de Wilmars |
| 1983 | 7: Gaston Thorn | Helmut Kohl | 2: Piet Dankert | West Germany | | 5: Josse Mertens de Wilmars |
| 1983 | 7: Gaston Thorn | Andreas Papandreou | 2: Piet Dankert | Greece | | 5: Josse Mertens de Wilmars |
| 1984 | 7: Gaston Thorn | François Mitterrand | 3: Pierre Pflimlin | France | | 6: Alexander Mackenzie Stuart |
| 1984 | 7: Gaston Thorn | Garret FitzGerald | 3: Pierre Pflimlin | Ireland | | 6: Alexander Mackenzie Stuart |
| 1985 | 7: Gaston Thorn | Bettino Craxi | 3: Pierre Pflimlin | Italy | | 6: Alexander Mackenzie Stuart |
| 1985 | 7: Gaston Thorn | Jacques Santer | 3: Pierre Pflimlin | Luxembourg | | 6: Alexander Mackenzie Stuart |
| 1986 | 8: Jacques Delors (I) | Ruud Lubbers | 3: Pierre Pflimlin | Netherlands | | 6: Alexander Mackenzie Stuart |
| 1986 | 8: Jacques Delors (I) | Margaret Thatcher | 3: Pierre Pflimlin | United Kingdom | | 6: Alexander Mackenzie Stuart |
| 1987 | 8: Jacques Delors (I) | Wilfried Martens | 4: Henry Plumb | Belgium | | 6: Alexander Mackenzie Stuart |
| 1987 | 8: Jacques Delors (I) | Poul Schlüter | 4: Henry Plumb | Denmark | | 6: Alexander Mackenzie Stuart |
| 1988 | 8: Jacques Delors (I) | Helmut Kohl | 4: Henry Plumb | West Germany | | 7: Ole Due |
| 1988 | 8: Jacques Delors (I) | Andreas Papandreou | 4: Henry Plumb | Greece | | 7: Ole Due |
| 1989 | 8: Jacques Delors (II) | Felipe González | 4: Henry Plumb | Spain | | 7: Ole Due |
| 1989 | 8: Jacques Delors (II) | François Mitterrand | 5: Enrique Barón Crespo | France | | 7: Ole Due |
| 1990 | 8: Jacques Delors (II) | Charles Haughey | 5: Enrique Barón Crespo | Ireland | | 7: Ole Due |
| 1990 | 8: Jacques Delors (II) | Giulio Andreotti | 5: Enrique Barón Crespo | Italy | | 7: Ole Due |
| 1991 | 8: Jacques Delors (II) | Jacques Santer | 5: Enrique Barón Crespo | Luxembourg | | 7: Ole Due |
| 1991 | 8: Jacques Delors (II) | Ruud Lubbers | 5: Enrique Barón Crespo | Netherlands | | 7: Ole Due |
| 1992 | 8: Jacques Delors (II) | Aníbal Cavaco Silva | 6: Egon Klepsch | Portugal | | 7: Ole Due |
| 1992 | 8: Jacques Delors (II) | John Major | 6: Egon Klepsch | United Kingdom | | 7: Ole Due |
| 1993 | 8: Jacques Delors (III) | Poul Schlüter | 6: Egon Klepsch | Denmark | | 7: Ole Due |
| 1993 | 8: Jacques Delors (III) | Poul Nyrup Rasmussen | 6: Egon Klepsch | Denmark | | 7: Ole Due |
| 1993 | 8: Jacques Delors (III) | Jean-Luc Dehaene | 6: Egon Klepsch | Belgium | | 7: Ole Due |
| 1994 | 8: Jacques Delors (III) | Andreas Papandreou | 6: Egon Klepsch | Greece | | 8: Gil Carlos Rodríguez Iglesias |
| 1994 | 8: Jacques Delors (III) | Helmut Kohl | 7: Klaus Hänsch | Germany | | 8: Gil Carlos Rodríguez Iglesias |
| 1995 | 9: Jacques Santer | François Mitterrand | 7: Klaus Hänsch | France | | 8: Gil Carlos Rodríguez Iglesias |
| 1995 | 9: Jacques Santer | Jacques Chirac | 7: Klaus Hänsch | France | | 8: Gil Carlos Rodríguez Iglesias |
| 1995 | 9: Jacques Santer | Felipe González | 7: Klaus Hänsch | Spain | | 8: Gil Carlos Rodríguez Iglesias |
| 1996 | 9: Jacques Santer | Lamberto Dini | 7: Klaus Hänsch | Italy | | 8: Gil Carlos Rodríguez Iglesias |
| 1996 | 9: Jacques Santer | Romano Prodi | 7: Klaus Hänsch | Italy | | 8: Gil Carlos Rodríguez Iglesias |
| 1996 | 9: Jacques Santer | John Bruton | 7: Klaus Hänsch | Ireland | | 8: Gil Carlos Rodríguez Iglesias |
| 1997 | 9: Jacques Santer | Wim Kok | 8: José María Gil-Robles | Netherlands | | 8: Gil Carlos Rodríguez Iglesias |
| 1997 | 9: Jacques Santer | Jean-Claude Juncker | 8: José María Gil-Robles | Luxembourg | | 8: Gil Carlos Rodríguez Iglesias |
| 1998 | 9: Jacques Santer | Tony Blair | 8: José María Gil-Robles | United Kingdom | | 8: Gil Carlos Rodríguez Iglesias |
| 1998 | 9: Jacques Santer | Viktor Klima | 8: José María Gil-Robles | Austria | | 8: Gil Carlos Rodríguez Iglesias |
| 1999 | 9: Jacques Santer | Gerhard Schröder | 8: José María Gil-Robles | Germany | | 8: Gil Carlos Rodríguez Iglesias |
| 1999 | Manuel Marín (acting) | Gerhard Schröder | 8: José María Gil-Robles | Germany | | 8: Gil Carlos Rodríguez Iglesias |
| 1999 | 10: Romano Prodi | Paavo Lipponen | 9: Nicole Fontaine | Finland | | 8: Gil Carlos Rodríguez Iglesias |
| 2000 | 10: Romano Prodi | António Guterres | 9: Nicole Fontaine | Portugal | | 8: Gil Carlos Rodríguez Iglesias |
| 2000 | 10: Romano Prodi | Jacques Chirac | 9: Nicole Fontaine | France | | 8: Gil Carlos Rodríguez Iglesias |
| 2001 | 10: Romano Prodi | Göran Persson | 9: Nicole Fontaine | Sweden | | 8: Gil Carlos Rodríguez Iglesias |
| 2001 | 10: Romano Prodi | Guy Verhofstadt | 9: Nicole Fontaine | Belgium | | 8: Gil Carlos Rodríguez Iglesias |
| 2002 | 10: Romano Prodi | José María Aznar López | 10: Pat Cox | Spain | | 8: Gil Carlos Rodríguez Iglesias |
| 2002 | 10: Romano Prodi | Anders Fogh Rasmussen | 10: Pat Cox | Denmark | | 8: Gil Carlos Rodríguez Iglesias |
| 2003 | 10: Romano Prodi | Costas Simitis | 10: Pat Cox | Greece | | 9: Vassilios Skouris |
| 2003 | 10: Romano Prodi | Silvio Berlusconi | 10: Pat Cox | Italy | | 9: Vassilios Skouris |
| 2004 | 10: Romano Prodi | Bertie Ahern | 10: Pat Cox | Ireland | | 9: Vassilios Skouris |
| 2004 | 11: José Manuel Barroso (I) | Jan Peter Balkenende | 11: Josep Borrell | Netherlands | | 9: Vassilios Skouris |
| 2005 | 11: José Manuel Barroso (I) | Jean-Claude Juncker | 11: Josep Borrell | Luxembourg | | 9: Vassilios Skouris |
| 2005 | 11: José Manuel Barroso (I) | Tony Blair | 11: Josep Borrell | United Kingdom | | 9: Vassilios Skouris |
| 2006 | 11: José Manuel Barroso (I) | Wolfgang Schüssel | 11: Josep Borrell | Austria | | 9: Vassilios Skouris |
| 2006 | 11: José Manuel Barroso (I) | Matti Vanhanen | 11: Josep Borrell | Finland | | 9: Vassilios Skouris |
| 2007 | 11: José Manuel Barroso (I) | Angela Merkel | 12: Hans-Gert Pöttering | T1 | Germany | 9: Vassilios Skouris |
| 2007 | 11: José Manuel Barroso (I) | José Sócrates | 12: Hans-Gert Pöttering | T1 | Portugal | 9: Vassilios Skouris |
| 2008 | 11: José Manuel Barroso (I) | Janez Janša | 12: Hans-Gert Pöttering | T1 | Slovenia | 9: Vassilios Skouris |
| 2008 | 11: José Manuel Barroso (I) | Nicolas Sarkozy | 12: Hans-Gert Pöttering | T2 | France | 9: Vassilios Skouris |
| 2009 | 11: José Manuel Barroso (I) | Mirek Topolánek | 12: Hans-Gert Pöttering | T2 | Czechia | 9: Vassilios Skouris |
| 2009 | 11: José Manuel Barroso (I) | Jan Fischer | 12: Hans-Gert Pöttering | T2 | Czechia | 9: Vassilios Skouris |
| 2009 | 11: José Manuel Barroso (I) | Fredrik Reinfeldt | 13: Jerzy Buzek | T2 | Sweden | 9: Vassilios Skouris |
| 2010 | 11: José Manuel Barroso (II) | 1. Herman Van Rompuy | 13: Jerzy Buzek | T3 | Spain | 9: Vassilios Skouris |
| 2010 | 11: José Manuel Barroso (II) | 1. Herman Van Rompuy | 13: Jerzy Buzek | T3 | Belgium | 9: Vassilios Skouris |
| 2011 | 11: José Manuel Barroso (II) | 1. Herman Van Rompuy | 13: Jerzy Buzek | T3 | Hungary | 9: Vassilios Skouris |
| 2011 | 11: José Manuel Barroso (II) | 1. Herman Van Rompuy | 13: Jerzy Buzek | T4 | Poland | 9: Vassilios Skouris |
| 2012 | 11: José Manuel Barroso (II) | 1. Herman Van Rompuy | 14: Martin Schulz | T4 | Denmark | 9: Vassilios Skouris |
| 2012 | 11: José Manuel Barroso (II) | 1. Herman Van Rompuy | 14: Martin Schulz | T4 | Cyprus | 9: Vassilios Skouris |
| 2013 | 11: José Manuel Barroso (II) | 1. Herman Van Rompuy | 14: Martin Schulz | T5 | Ireland | 9: Vassilios Skouris |
| 2013 | 11: José Manuel Barroso (II) | 1. Herman Van Rompuy | 14: Martin Schulz | T5 | Lithuania | 9: Vassilios Skouris |
| 2014 | 11: José Manuel Barroso (II) | 1. Herman Van Rompuy | 14: Martin Schulz | T5 | Greece | 9: Vassilios Skouris |
| 2014 | 11: José Manuel Barroso (II) | 1. Herman Van Rompuy | 14: Martin Schulz | T6 | Italy | 9: Vassilios Skouris |
| 2015 | 12: Jean-Claude Juncker | 2. Donald Tusk | 14: Martin Schulz | T6 | Latvia | 9: Vassilios Skouris |
| 2015 | 12: Jean-Claude Juncker | 2. Donald Tusk | 14: Martin Schulz | T6 | Luxembourg | 9: Vassilios Skouris |
| 2016 | 12: Jean-Claude Juncker | 2. Donald Tusk | 14: Martin Schulz | T7 | Netherlands | 10: Koen Lenaerts |
| 2016 | 12: Jean-Claude Juncker | 2. Donald Tusk | 15: Antonio Tajani | T7 | Slovakia | 10: Koen Lenaerts |
| 2017 | 12: Jean-Claude Juncker | 2. Donald Tusk | 15: Antonio Tajani | T7 | Malta | 10: Koen Lenaerts |
| 2017 | 12: Jean-Claude Juncker | 2. Donald Tusk | 15: Antonio Tajani | T8 | Estonia | 10: Koen Lenaerts |
| 2018 | 12: Jean-Claude Juncker | 2. Donald Tusk | 15: Antonio Tajani | T8 | Bulgaria | 10: Koen Lenaerts |
| 2018 | 12: Jean-Claude Juncker | 2. Donald Tusk | 15: Antonio Tajani | T8 | Austria | 10: Koen Lenaerts |
| 2019 | 12: Jean-Claude Juncker | 2. Donald Tusk | 15: Antonio Tajani | T9 | Romania | 10: Koen Lenaerts |
| 2019 | 12: Jean-Claude Juncker | 2. Donald Tusk | 16: David Sassoli | T9 | Finland | 10: Koen Lenaerts |
| 2020 | 13: Ursula von der Leyen I | 3. Charles Michel | 16: David Sassoli | T9 | Croatia | 10: Koen Lenaerts |
| 2020 | 13: Ursula von der Leyen I | 3. Charles Michel | 16: David Sassoli | T10 | Germany | 10: Koen Lenaerts |
| 2021 | 13: Ursula von der Leyen I | 3. Charles Michel | 16: David Sassoli | T10 | Portugal | 10: Koen Lenaerts |
| 2021 | 13: Ursula von der Leyen I | 3. Charles Michel | 16: David Sassoli | T10 | Slovenia | 10: Koen Lenaerts |
| 2022 | 13: Ursula von der Leyen I | 3. Charles Michel | 16: David Sassoli | T11 | France | 10: Koen Lenaerts |
| 2022 | 13: Ursula von der Leyen I | 3. Charles Michel | 17: Roberta Metsola Term expires January 2027 | T11 | France | 10: Koen Lenaerts |
| 2022 | 13: Ursula von der Leyen I | 3. Charles Michel | 17: Roberta Metsola Term expires January 2027 | T11 | Czechia | 10: Koen Lenaerts |
| 2023 | 13: Ursula von der Leyen I | 3. Charles Michel | 17: Roberta Metsola Term expires January 2027 | T11 | Sweden | 10: Koen Lenaerts |
| 2023 | 13: Ursula von der Leyen I | 3. Charles Michel | 17: Roberta Metsola Term expires January 2027 | T12 | Spain | 10: Koen Lenaerts |
| 2024 | 13: Ursula von der Leyen I | 3. Charles Michel | 17: Roberta Metsola Term expires January 2027 | T12 | Belgium | 10: Koen Lenaerts |
| 2024 | 13: Ursula von der Leyen I | 3. Charles Michel | 17: Roberta Metsola Term expires January 2027 | T12 | Hungary | 10: Koen Lenaerts |
| 2025 | 13: Ursula von der Leyen II Term expires 31 Oct 2029 | 4: António Costa Term expires 30 November 2029 | 17: Roberta Metsola Term expires January 2027 | T13 | Poland | 10: Koen Lenaerts |
| 2025 | 13: Ursula von der Leyen II Term expires 31 Oct 2029 | 4: António Costa Term expires 30 November 2029 | 17: Roberta Metsola Term expires January 2027 | T13 | Denmark | 10: Koen Lenaerts |
| 2026 | 13: Ursula von der Leyen II Term expires 31 Oct 2029 | 4: António Costa Term expires 30 November 2029 | 17: Roberta Metsola Term expires January 2027 | T13 | Cyprus | 10: Koen Lenaerts |

== See also ==
- President of the European Union
