= Luigi Martinelli =

Luigi Martinelli may refer to:

- Luigi Martinelli (footballer)
- Luigi Martinelli (engineer)
