= Frati =

Frati may refer to:

== People ==
- Dorina Frati, Italian classical mandolin player
- Luigi Frati (born 1943), Italian academic physician
- Stelio Frati (1919–2010 ), Italian mechanical engineer and aeroplane designer

== Other ==
- Corte de' Frati, town and comune in the Italian province of Cremona
- Monte dei Frati, mountain in the Italian province of Arezzo
