= Melchiorre =

Melchiorre may refer to:

== As first name ==
- Melchiorre Cafà (1636–1667), Maltese sculptor
- Melchiore Cesarotti (1730–1808), Italian poet
- Melchiorre Delfico (caricaturist) (1825–1895), Italian caricaturist
- Melchiorre Delfico (economist) (1744–1835), Italian economist
- Melchiorre Gherardini (1607–1668), Italian painter
- Melchiorre Gioia (1767–1829), Italian philosopher and economist
- Melchiorre Grimaldi (died 1512), Italian Bishop
- Melchiorre Luise (1896–1967), Italian opera singer
- Melchiorre Martelli, regent of San Marino
- Melchiorre da Montalbano, Italian architect and sculptor
- Melchiorre Murenu (1803–1854), Sardinian poet
- Melchiorre Zoppio (1544–1634), Italian doctor and scholar

== As surname ==
- Daniela Melchiorre (born 1970), Italian magistrate and politician
- Gene Melchiorre (1927–2019), American college basketball player
- Luigi Melchiorre (born 1859), Italian sculptor
