= Mario Scelba =

Italian politician (1901–1991)

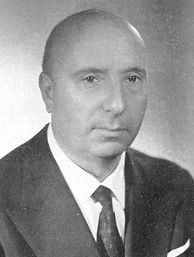

Prime Minister of Italy
- In office 10 February 1954 – 6 July 1955
- President: Luigi Einaudi; Giovanni Gronchi
- Preceded by: Amintore Fanfani
- Succeeded by: Antonio Segni

8th President of the European Parliament
- In office 11 March 1969 – 16 March 1971
- Preceded by: Alain Poher
- Succeeded by: Walter Behrendt
Ministerial offices
Minister of the Interior
In office 26 July 1960 – 21 February 1962
Prime Minister	Amintore Fanfani
Preceded by	Giuseppe Spataro
Succeeded by	Paolo Emilio Taviani
In office 10 February 1954 – 6 July 1955
Prime Minister	Himself
Preceded by	Giulio Andreotti
Succeeded by	Fernando Tambroni
In office 2 February 1947 – 16 July 1953
Prime Minister	Alcide De Gasperi
Preceded by	Alcide De Gasperi
Succeeded by	Amintore Fanfani
Minister of Mails and Communications
In office 21 June 1945 – 2 February 1947
Prime Minister	Ferruccio Parri; Alcide De Gasperi
Preceded by	Mario Cevolotto
Succeeded by	Luigi Cacciatore
Parliamentary offices
Member of the Senate of the Republic
In office 5 June 1968 – 11 July 1983
Constituency	Acireale (1968–1979); Caltagirone (1979–1983)
Member of the Chamber of Deputies
In office 8 May 1948 – 4 June 1968
Constituency	Catania
Member of the Constituent Assembly
In office 25 June 1946 – 31 January 1948
Constituency	Catania

Personal details
- Born: 5 September 1901 Caltagirone, Italy
- Died: 29 October 1991 (aged 90) Rome, Italy
- Party: Christian Democracy
- Spouse: Nerina Palestini (m. 1929) (1900-1976)
- Children: 1
- Education: Sapienza University of Rome

Mario Scelba (pronounced [ˈmaːrjo ʃˈʃɛlba]; 5 September 1901 – 29 October 1991) was an Italian politician and statesman who was the 33rd prime minister of Italy from February 1954 to July 1955. A founder of Christian Democracy (DC), Scelba was one of the longest-serving Minister of the Interior in the history of the republic, having served at the Viminale Palace in three distinct terms from 1947 to 1962.

A fervent pro-Europeanist, Scelba was President of the European Parliament from March 1969 to March 1971. Known for his law and order policies, he was a key figure in Italy's post-war reconstruction, thanks to his drastic reorganization of the Italian police, which came out heavily disorganised from the war.

== Early life ==
Scelba was born in Caltagirone, Sicily, in 1901. His father Gaetano Scelba was a poor sharecropper on land owned by the priest Don Luigi Sturzo, while his mother Maria Gambino was a housewife. The couple had five children, one of whom died during his young age. Scelba grew up in an observant Catholic family. At only 12 years old, he was forced to leave school to help his family's finances. In 1914, Don Sturzo took steps to guarantee an education to Scelba, who began attending the first class of the lower gymnasium in Caltagirone. The outbreak of the World War I forced the institute to suspend lessons and Scelba recovered the lost years by studying as a privatist and achieving the classical diploma in 1920. He then studied law and graduated at the Sapienza University of Rome in 1924, with a thesis on regional decentralization.

During university, he was selected by Sturzo as his private assistant and secretary. From 1919 Sturzo was in fact the leader of a Christian-democratic party, the Italian People's Party (PPI), and was one of the most important politicians in the country. When the fascist dictator Benito Mussolini rose to power, suppressing all the other parties, including the PPI, Sturzo was forced into exile, while Scelba remained in Rome as his informer. During the regime, Scelba wrote for the newspaper Il Popolo ("The People"); when it was banned by the Italian fascist regime in 1925, he founded a clandestine weekly newspaper known as L'idea popolare ("People's Idea"). In these years, Scelba started his career as a lawyer in the law firm of Filippo Del Giudice, and when the latter was forced to leave the country to save from fascist repression, Scelba inherited his customers.

In 1929 Scelba married Nerina Palestini, from San Benedetto del Tronto, from whom he had a daughter Maria Luisa, born in 1930.

== Early political career ==
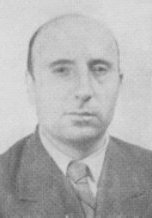
Mario Scelba in 1946

During the 1930s Scelba became a close friend of Alcide De Gasperi, former leader of the People's Party after Sturzo's exile. Along with De Gasperi, he collaborated in the drafting of the "Reconstructive Ideas of Christian Democracy", the first programmatic document of the future party, which was published in July 1943. Scelba was part of the committee which led the new party, known as the DC, during the German occupation. He was also arrested by the Nazis but was released within three days. After the liberation of Rome in June 1944, he joined the executive committee of the new party. In the interregional congress of the DC, held in Naples on 29 and 30 July 1944, Scelba was elected to the party's national council, which appointed De Gasperi as new secretary. Scelba was instead appointed deputy secretary.

In September 1943, as a member of the DC, Scelba joined the National Liberation Committee (CLN), a political umbrella organization and the main representative of the Italian resistance movement fighting against the German occupation of Italy in the aftermath of the armistice of Cassibile. On 21 June 1945, Ferruccio Parri, leader of the Action Party, became the new prime minister and appointed Scelba as Minister of Mails and Telecommunications, a position that he would held until February 1947, even under the premiership of Alcide De Gasperi.

On 25 September 1945 Scelba was appointed to the National Council, the unelected legislative assembly established in the Kingdom of Italy after the end of the war. In the 1946 Italian general election, Scelba was elected in the Constituent Assembly for the constituency of Catania–Messina–Siracusa–Ragusa–Enna with nearly 40,000 votes.

== Minister of the Interior (1947–1953) ==
On 2 February 1947 Scelba became Minister of the Interior in the third government of Alcide de Gasperi, and remained in office until July 1953. During these years, Scelba was probably the most powerful man in the country, after De Gasperi. Having witnessed the Red Biennium and the violent fascist reaction, which caused the crisis of the liberal state and the subsequent formation of the dictatorship, Scelba was deeply convinced that the control of public order was necessary for the defense of the newly founded democratic and republican institutions; in fact, during all his tenure he was a strong advocate of law and order policies. His hard-fisted record earned him the nickname "Iron Sicilian" for his ruthless suppression of left-wing workers' protests and strikes, as well as neo-fascist rallies.

=== Portella della Ginestra massacre ===
After just three months in office as Minister of the Interior, Scelba was confronted with the Portella della Ginestra massacre. Twelve days after the left-wing election victory in the Sicilian regional elections of 1947, the 1 May labour parade in Portella della Ginestra was attacked, culminating in the killing of 11 people and the wounding of over thirty. The attack was attributed to the bandit and separatist leader Salvatore Giuliano, the aim being to punish local leftists for the recent election results.

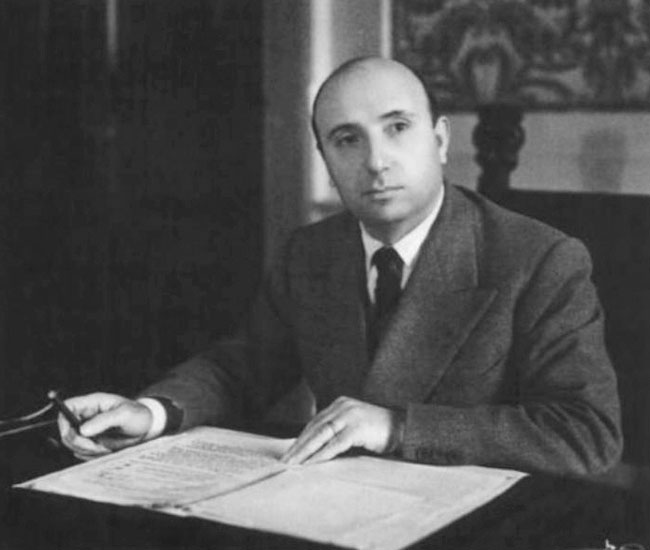
Mario Scelba in 1947

Scelba reported to Parliament the next day that so far as the police could determine, the Portella della Ginestra shooting was non-political. He claimed that bandits notoriously infested the valley in which it occurred; however, that version was challenged by the left. The Italian Communist Party (PCI) deputy Girolamo Li Causi stressed the political nature of the massacre, claiming that the Mafia had perpetrated the attack, in cahoots with the large landowners, monarchists and the rightist Common Man's Front. He also claimed that police inspector Ettore Messana – supposed to coordinate the prosecution of the bandits – had been in league with Giuliano and denounced Scelba for allowing Messana to remain in office. Later documents would substantiate the accusation.

Li Causi and Scelba would be the main opponents in the aftermath of the massacre – the subsequent killing of the alleged perpetrator, Salvatore Giuliano, and the trial against Giuliano's lieutenant Gaspare Pisciotta and other remaining members of Giuliano's gang. The trial of those responsible was held in the city of Viterbo, starting in the summer of 1950. During the trial, Scelba was again accused of involvement in the plot to carry out the massacre, but the accusations were often contradictory or vague. In the end, the judge concluded that no higher authority had ordered the massacre and that the Giuliano band had acted autonomously. At the trial Pisciotta said: "Again and again Scelba has gone back on his word: Mattarella and Cusumano returned to Rome to plead for total amnesty for us, but Scelba denied all his promises." Pisciotta also claimed that he had killed Salvatore Giuliano in his sleep by arrangement with Scelba; however, there was no evidence that Scelba had had any relationship with Pisciotta.

=== 1948 election ===
The general election in April 1948 was heavily influenced by the Cold War confrontation between the Soviet Union and the United States. After the Soviet-inspired February 1948 Communist coup in Czechoslovakia, the US became alarmed about Soviet intentions and feared that, if the leftist coalition were to win the elections, the Soviet-funded PCI would draw Italy into the Soviet Union's sphere of influence.

The election campaign remained unmatched in verbal aggression and fanaticism in Italy's republican history. The DC propaganda became famous in claiming that in Communist countries "children sent parents to jail", "children were owned by the state", "people ate their own children", and claiming disaster would strike Italy if the left-wing would take power.

As interior minister, Scelba announced that the government had 330,000 men under arms, including a special shock force of 150,000 ready to take on communists if they would try to make troubles on election day. The election was eventually won with a comfortable margin by the DC; the DC defeated the left-wing coalition of the Popular Democratic Front (FDP) that comprised the PCI and the Italian Socialist Party (PSI). After the election, De Gasperi continued ruling without the PCI, which had been in government from June 1944, when the first post-war government was formed, until May 1947, while Scelba kept his role as Minister of the Interior.

=== Reorganization of the police ===
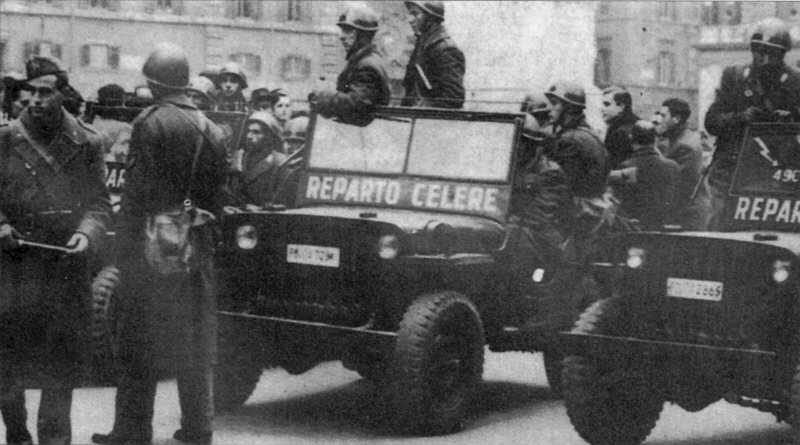
The Reparto Celere, a special jeep-riding riot squad of the Italian police

During his ministry Scelba deeply reorganized the Italian police, starting with the expulsion of more than 8,000 former partisans, with the accusation of being communist insurgents. When he took office, the police's organization was so shoddy that Scelba exclaimed: "If I were communist, I would start a revolution tomorrow." During his rule, he transformed country's dishevelled police into a force of some 100,000 agents and established a riot squad, heavily armed and equipped with armoured cars and special jeep, called the Reparto Celere ("Fast Department"). Scelba made himself known as a man of action against what he considered communist disorder. In doing so, Scelba was also criticised by many DC members who disapproved of his harsh methods. In 1952, he wrote the Scelba Law, which introduced the crime of apology for fascism.

Scelba had a conservative attitude toward certain issues such as scant bathing suits, public kissing and nude statues. Despite this and his single-minded concern for law and order, on socio-economic issues Scelba leaned left of centre in the DC. He favoured more social reforms and public works, attacking speculators for pushing up prices. He once said: "It is virtually impossible to be Minister of Interior for a government that does not care if the people work or not." Scelba emphasized the possibility of undermining communist strength "by determined measures of social and economic improvement, like a land reform of the great estates in Southern Italy, for example." While in office, he was also involved in setting up the Gladio network, the clandestine NATO "stay-behind" operation in Italy after World War II, intended to organise resistance after a Warsaw Pact invasion of Western Europe.

=== 1953 election ===
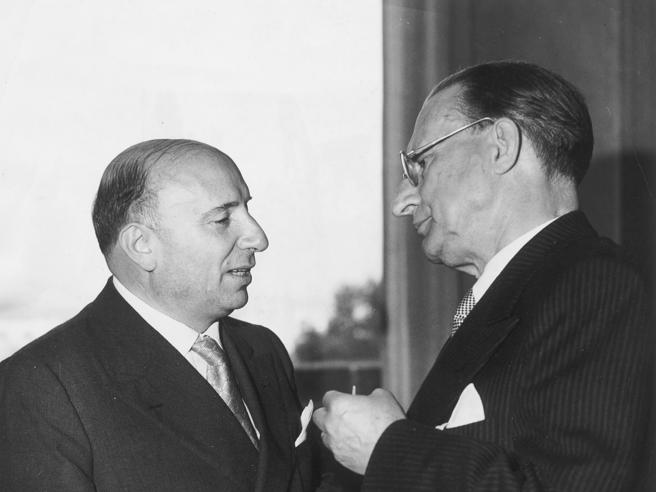
Mario Scelba with Prime Minister Alcide De Gasperi during the 1950s

The 1953 general election was characterised by changes in the electoral law. Even if the general structure remained uncorrupted, the government introduced a superbonus of two-thirds of seats in the House for the coalition which would obtain at-large the absolute majority of votes. The change was strongly opposed by the opposition parties as well as DC's smaller coalition partners, who had no realistic chance of success under this system. The new law was called the Scam Law by its detractors, including some dissidents of minor government parties who founded special opposition groups to deny the artificial landslide to the DC. The campaign of the opposition to the Scam Law achieved its goal. The government coalition won 49.9% of national vote, just a few thousand votes of the threshold for a supermajority, resulting in an ordinary proportional distribution of the seats. Technically, the government won the election, winning a clear working majority of seats in both houses. But frustration with the failure to win a supermajority caused significant tensions in the leading coalition. De Gasperi was forced to resign by the Italian Parliament on 2 August. On 17 August, President Einaudi appointed Pella as new Prime Minister of Italy.

== Prime Minister of Italy (1954–1955) ==
Pella's government lasted only five months, and Fanfani became the new prime minister in January 1954; however, he was forced to resign after only 23 days in power, and then Italian president Luigi Einaudi gave Scelba the task of forming a new cabinet. On 10 February, he sworn in as new prime minister at the head of a centrist coalition government composed by DC, Italian Democratic Socialist Party (PSDI) and Italian Liberal Party (PLI).

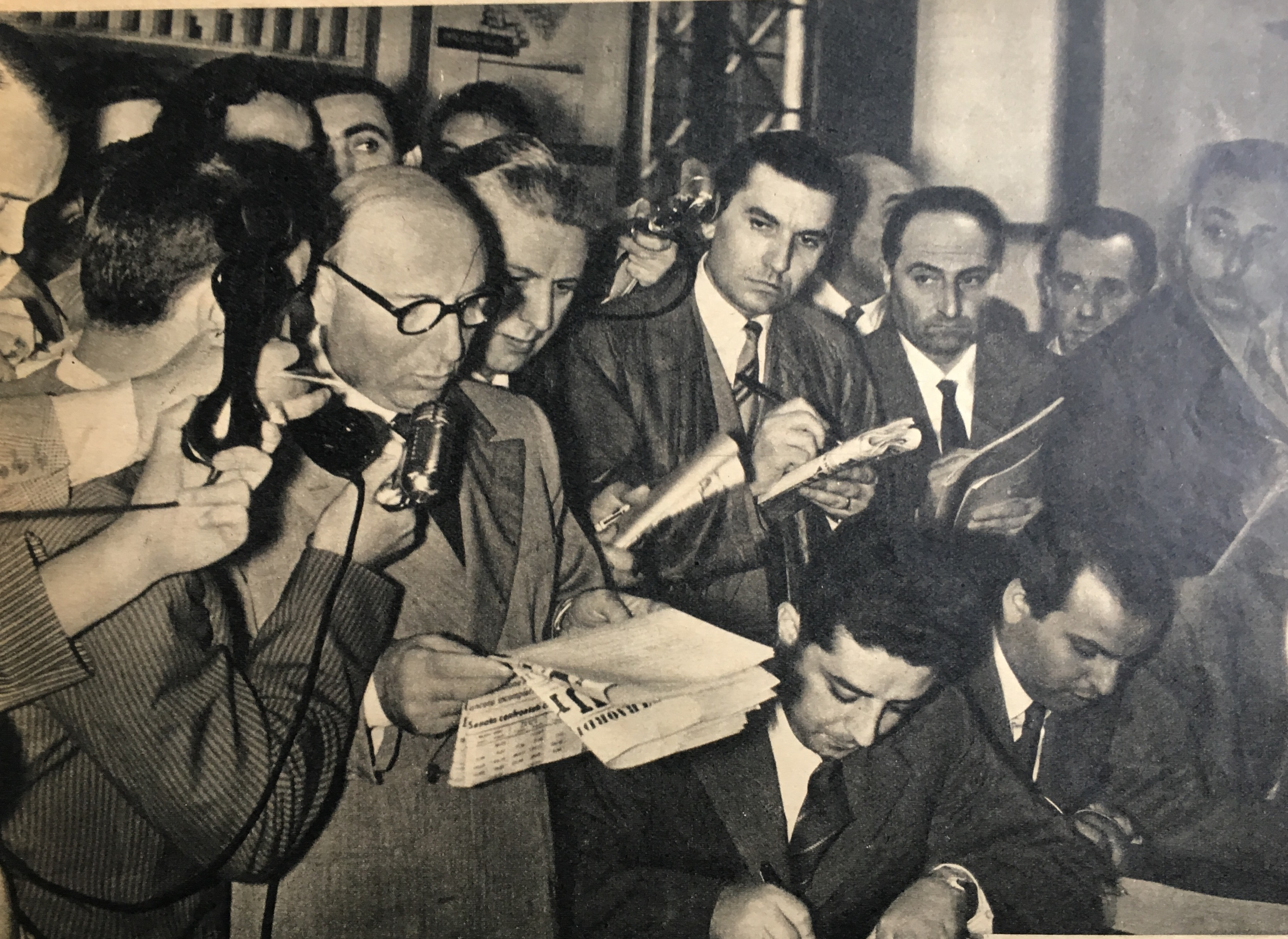
Scelba speaks with journalists in 1953.

During his premiership, he built strong relations with the United States and NATO and resolved many wartime issues notably including the difficult situation in the Free Territory of Trieste. A few months before, former prime minister Pella risked an open conflict with Josip Broz Tito's Yugoslavia, Scelba instead pursued a diplomatic way, which brought to the sign of the "London Memorandum" on 5 October 1954. The deal gave the former "Zone A" with Trieste to Italy for ordinary civil administration, and "Zone B", which had already had a Communist government since 1947, to Yugoslavia.

While appointed prime minister, the aftermath of the Portella della Ginestra massacre came to haunt Scelba again. On 9 February 1954 Gaspare Pisciotta was found dead in his cell. After Pisciotta had been sentenced to life in imprisonment and forced labour, he realized that he had been abandoned by all. He declared that he was going to tell the whole truth, in particular, who signed the letter which had been brought to Giuliano, which demanded the massacre at Portella delle Ginestra in exchange for liberty for the bandits and which Giuliano had destroyed immediately. The cause of Pisciotta's death, as revealed by the autopsy, was the ingestion of 20 mg of strychnine. Both the government and the Sicilian Mafia were suggested as being behind the murder of Pisciotta, although no one was ever brought to trial. Neo-fascist and communist press did their best to put it on the newly appointed Scelba's administration but had no evidence to go on.

Another scandal that hurled Scelba's government was the Montesi affair. Foreign Minister Attilio Piccioni, a co-founder of DC, as well as the national police chief, had to resign when Piccioni's jazz-pianist son was implicated in the scandal involving sex, narcotics and the death of party girl Wilma Montesi.

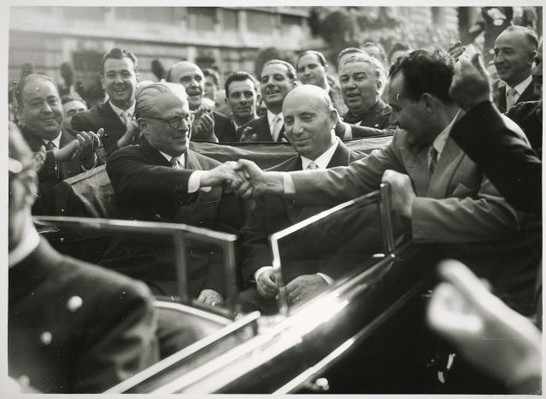
Scelba with Giovanni Gronchi, after his election as president

At the end of 1954, Scelba approved a package of measures against the PCI and trade unions that was largely modelled on United States psychological warfare plans first elaborated in 1951–52. This proved to be only an attempt to consolidate his precarious position at home by obtaining formal American backing. Its half-hearted implementation exacerbated Washington's resentment toward its Italian allies and barely affected PCI's organizational structure. The PCI used the episode to denounce the illiberal and authoritarian nature of the DC government and to pose itself once more as the real defender of political freedoms and constitutional rights.

In April 1955, Giovanni Gronchi was elected new president of the Italian Republic. Scelba presented to the newly elected head of state the formal resignation of his government: it was an act of courtesy towards the new president, who, in the absence of a majority crisis, should reject them, but Gronchi did not do it. This generated a real political crisis, during which Fanfani, as secretary of the DC, kept Scelba out of the formation of the new cabinet, even if he was formally the designated prime minister. In July 1955 Scelba renounced the office, and on 6 July, Antonio Segni sworn in as new prime minister. Scelba, whose fall was caused by the political manoeuvring of his party's rivals, always stated that he had been overthrown not by a parliamentary vote but by a party coup.

== After the premiership ==
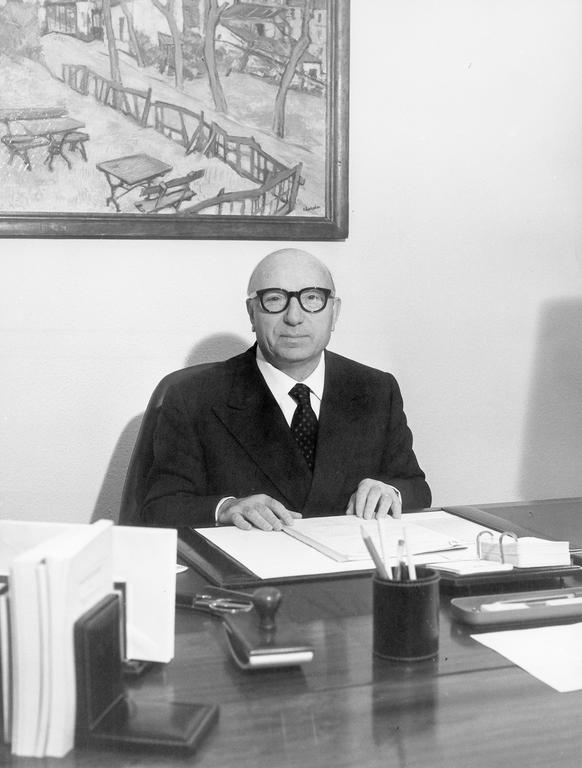
Scelba in his office during the 1970s

After his resignation, a period of centre-left governments began and Scelba lost lot of his influence over the party. In 1958, Scelba formed his own faction within the DC, known as Centrismo popolare ("People's Centrism") and composed conservative by politicians such Guido Gonella, Roberto Lucifredi, Mario Martinelli and Oscar Luigi Scalfaro, which would be dissolved in 1968.

On 26 July 1960, he was appointed Minister of the Interior in Fanfani's third cabinet. In fact, the disorders which caused the fall of Fernando Tambroni's government, made Scelba's return to the Viminale Palace necessary to protect public order against violent demonstrations. In that role, he also had to face the break out of tensions in South Tyrol, where some serious bombing attacks had taken place by South Tyrolean separatist movements. Scelba adopted extraordinary measures to save public order and established an advisory commission called to draw up proposals to promote coexistence between different ethnic-linguistic groups. Scelba remained in office until February 1962, when Fanfani proposed a cabinet reshuffle, ousting him from office.

During the rest of his political career, he always tried to oppose the positions of DC members who, like Fanfani and Aldo Moro, worked to overcome centrist policies, starting a gradual convergence with the PSI. A fervent supporter of European integration, he was a member of the European Parliament from 1960 to 1979 and served as President of the EP from 1969 to 1971, becoming the third Italian to hold the office after De Gasperi and Pella. He ran in the first European election in June 1979, for the constituency Italian Islands, receiving nearly 200,000 votes but he did not succeed in being elected, arriving third after Salvo Lima and Vincenzo Giumarra. In 1983, after the end of the 8th legislature, he retired from politics.

== Death and legacy ==
On 29 October 1991, Scelba died of thrombosis aged 90 at his home in Rome. Within the DC, Scelba had always represented the tradition of popularismo, which was deeply linked to the PPI. He embodied the values of democratic Catholicism and anti-fascism, inherited by Don Sturzo's policies. Scelba always loyally supported De Gasperi in building a democratic and parliamentarian system during the post-war years. In his relationship with the Catholic Church, even as a practicing Catholic, Scelba defended the secularism of the state and its independence from the Catholic Church.

Scelba was bestknown for his law and order policies. As minister, he went through a repressive policy which, according to historians like Giuseppe Carlo Marino, professor at the University of Palermo, represented an anti-democratic action. Scelba's aversion to socialist and communist ideas of social justice led to violating the constitutional freedoms. According to Indro Montanelli, the police reorganization that Scelba carried out allowed a drastic reduction in political crimes and an improvement in the security of citizens.

== Electoral history ==
Election	House	Constituency	Party	Votes	Result
1946	Constituent Assembly	Catania–Messina–Siracusa–Ragusa–Enna	DC	39,587	Elected
1948	Chamber of Deputies	Catania–Messina–Siracusa–Ragusa–Enna	DC	223,005	Elected
1953	Chamber of Deputies	Catania–Messina–Siracusa–Ragusa–Enna	DC	181,084	Elected
1958	Chamber of Deputies	Catania–Messina–Siracusa–Ragusa–Enna	DC	150,048	Elected
1963	Chamber of Deputies	Catania–Messina–Siracusa–Ragusa–Enna	DC	126,414	Elected
1968	Senate of the Republic	Sicily – Acireale	DC	37,966	Elected
1972	Senate of the Republic	Sicily – Acireale	DC	40,592	Elected
1976	Senate of the Republic	Sicily – Acireale	DC	45,871	Elected
1979	Senate of the Republic	Sicily – Caltagirone	DC	29,465	Elected
1979	European Parliament	Italian Islands	DC	199,050	Not elected

== Sources ==
- Dickie, John (2004). Cosa Nostra. A history of the Sicilian Mafia, London: Coronet ISBN 0-340-82435-2
- Ganser, Daniele (2005). NATO's secret Armies. Operation Gladio and Terrorism in Western Europe, London: Frank Cass ISBN 0-7146-8500-3
- Servadio, Gaia (1976), Mafioso. A history of the Mafia from its origins to the present day, London: Secker & Warburg ISBN 0-436-44700-2

Political offices
Preceded by Mario Cevolotto	Minister of Mails and Communications; 1945–1947	Succeeded by Luigi Cacciatore
Preceded by Alcide De Gasperi	Minister of the Interior; 1947–1953	Succeeded by Amintore Fanfani
Preceded by Amintore Fanfani	Prime Minister of Italy; 1954–1955	Succeeded by Antonio Segni
Preceded by Giulio Andreotti	Minister of the Interior; 1954–1955	Succeeded by Fernando Tambroni
Preceded by Giuseppe Spataro	Minister of the Interior; 1960–1962	Succeeded by Paolo Emilio Taviani
Preceded by Alain Poher	President of the European Parliament; 1969–1971	Succeeded by Walter Behrendt
