= President of the European Parliament =

Head of debate oversight in the European Union legislature

- Logo of the Parliament

- Flag of Europe

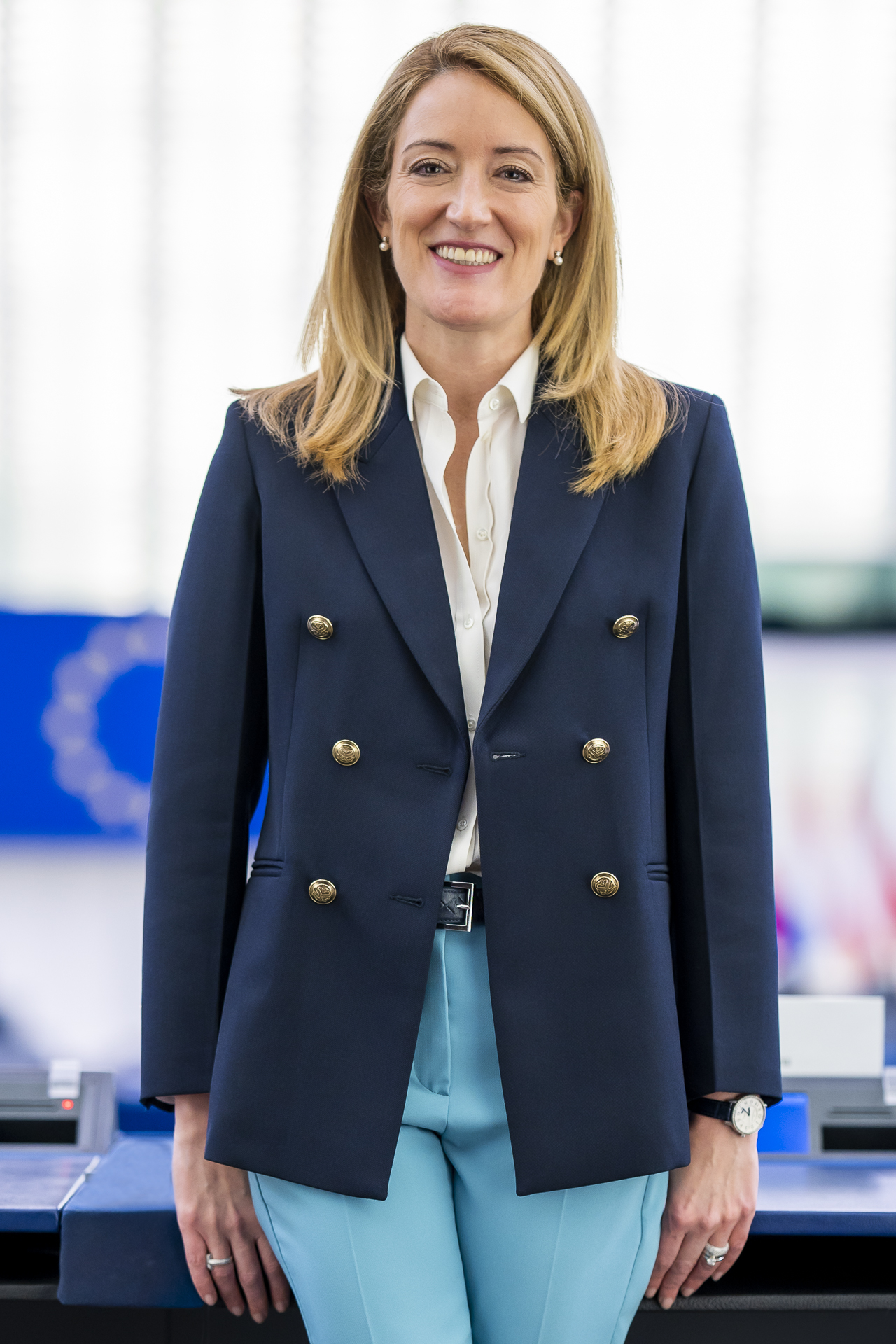
- Incumbent; Roberta Metsola since 18 January 2022
- European Parliament
- Style: President
- Status: Presiding officer
- Member of: European Parliament
- Residence: Louise Weiss building
- Seat: Strasbourg, France
- Appointer: European Parliament
- Term length: 2.5 years
- Inaugural holder: Paul Henri Spaak / Robert Schuman
- Formation: 1952 / 1958
- Deputy: Vice-Presidents of the European Parliament
- Website: the-president.europarl.europa.eu/en/

The president of the European Parliament presides over the debates and activities of the European Parliament. They also represent the Parliament within the European Union (EU) and internationally. The president's signature is required for laws initiated under co-decision and the EU budget.

Presidents serve 2.5-year terms, normally alternating between the two major political parties. There have been 30 presidents since the Parliament was created in 1952, 17 of whom have served since the first parliamentary election in 1979. Three presidents have been women and most have come from the older member states.

== Role in Parliament ==
The president chairs debates and oversees all the activities of the Parliament and its constituent bodies (ensuring the Parliament's rules of procedure are applied), in this the role is similar to that of a speaker in a national parliament. Below the president, there are 14 vice-presidents who chair debates when the president is not in the chamber. The president also chairs the meetings of the Bureau, which is responsible for budgetary and administration issues, and the Conference of Presidents, which is a governing body composed of the presidents of each of the parliament's political groups.

== Position in the Union ==
The president represents Parliament in all legal matters and external relations, particularly international relations. When the European Council meets, the president addresses it to give the Parliament's position on subjects on the council's agenda. The president also takes part in Intergovernmental Conferences on new treaties. The president's signature is also required for the budget of the European Union and Union acts adopted under codecision procedure to be adopted. The president also chairs conciliation committees with the Council under these areas.

In most countries, the protocol of the head of state comes before all others. However, in the EU the Parliament is listed as the first institution, and hence the protocol of its president comes before any other European, or national, protocol. The gifts given to numerous visiting dignitaries depends upon the president. President Josep Borrell MEP of Spain gave his counterparts a crystal cup created by an artist from Barcelona which had engraved upon it parts of the Charter of Fundamental Rights among other things.

With the reorganisation of leading EU posts under the Lisbon Treaty, there was some criticism of each post's vague responsibilities. Ukrainian ambassador to the EU Andriy Veselovsky praised the framework and clarified it in his own terms: The president of the European Commission speaks as the EU's "government" while the president of the European Council is a "strategist". The high representative specialises in "bilateral relations" while the European commissioner for enlargement and European neighbourhood policy deals in technical matters such as the free trade agreement with Ukraine. The Parliament's president meanwhile articulates the EU's values such as democratic elections in other countries.

== Election ==
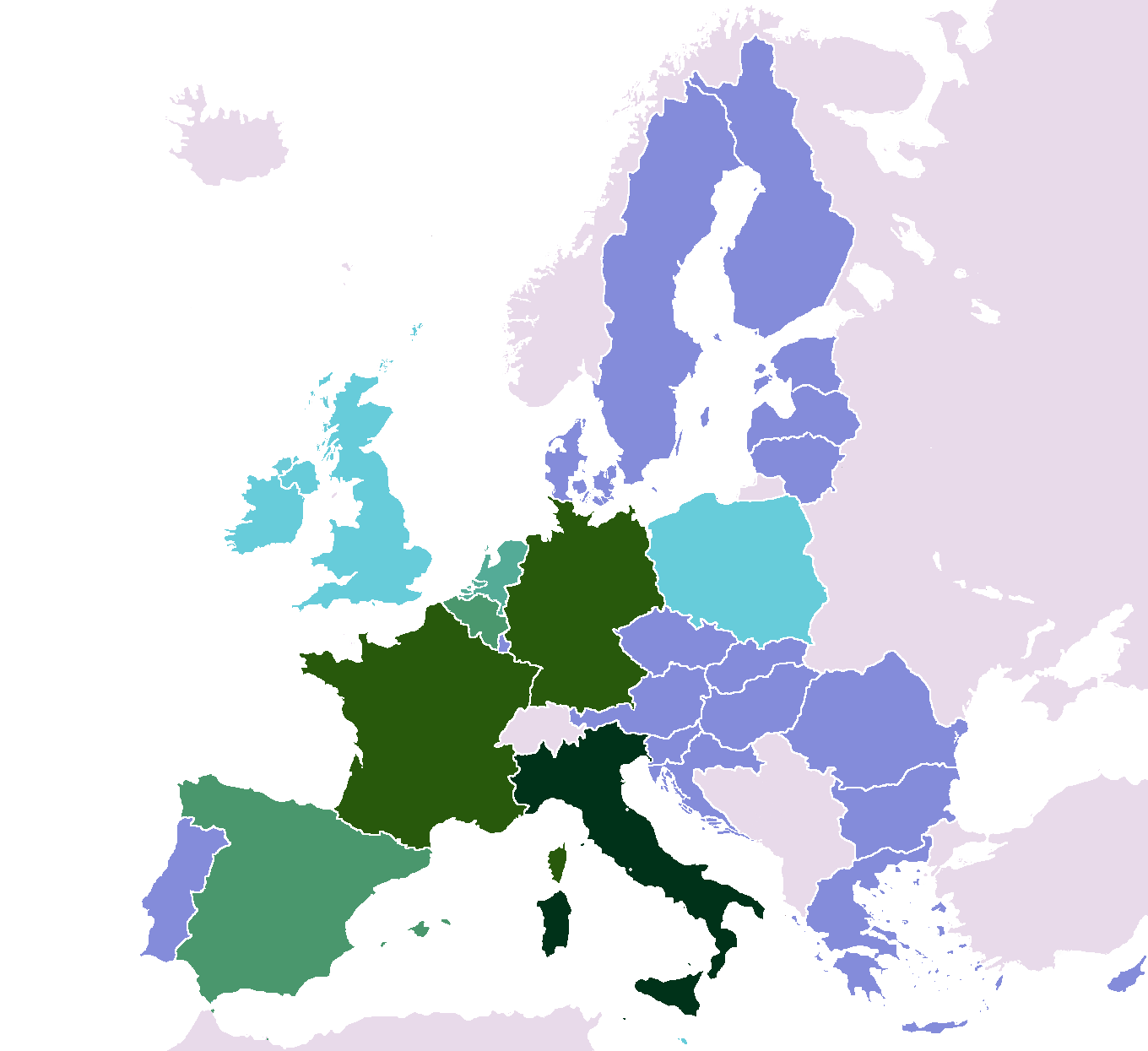
Map showing the number of presidents from each state: Seven / Six Five / Three Two / One None

The president is elected by the members of Parliament for a two-and-a-half-year term, meaning two elections per parliamentary term, hence two presidents normally serve during any one Parliamentary term. Since the 1980s, the two major parties in the Parliament, the European People's Party (EPP) and Party of European Socialists (PES), have had the custom of sharing the two presidencies between themselves. For example, in the 2004–2009 legislature the EPP supported the PES candidate for president and, when his term expired in 2007, the PES supported the EPP's candidate. This resulted in large majorities for presidents, although there are some exceptions: in the 1999–2004 legislature, under an EPP–Liberal deal, the president for the second half of the term was a Liberal, rather than a Socialist.

Starting from the 2009–2014 session of the Parliament the outgoing president presides over the election of the new president, provided that the outgoing president is re-elected as an MEP. If the outgoing president is not re-elected as an MEP then one of the 14 vice-presidents takes up the role. While the outgoing president or vice-president is in the chair, they hold all the powers of the president, but the only business that may be addressed is the election of the new president.

Before the ballot nominations are handed to the chair who announces them to Parliament. If no member holds an absolute majority after three ballots, a fourth is held with only the two members holding the highest number of votes on the previous ballot. If there is still a tie following this, the eldest candidate is declared elected.

A number of notable figures have been President of the Parliament and its predecessors. The first president was Paul-Henri Spaak, one of the founding fathers of the Union. Other founding fathers include Alcide de Gasperi and Robert Schuman. The first two female presidents were Simone Veil MEP in 1979 (first president of the elected Parliament) and Nicole Fontaine MEP in 1999, both Frenchwomen. Jerzy Buzek, former prime minister of Poland and member of Solidarity Electoral Action, was elected as the first president from the central and eastern European countries which joined in the 2000s (more precisely, he is the first person from a country that joined the EU after 1986 to hold the post).

=== Oldest member ===
Prior to 2009, the "oldest member", the eldest MEP (similar to the Father of the House), presided over the chamber during the election of the president rather than the previous president. The member had all the duties of president but the only business that could be addressed was the election of the president.

In 2009, the Parliament's rules were changed so that the outgoing president (if re-elected as an MEP) or one of the outgoing vice-presidents would chair the first session of Parliament until a new president was elected.

=== Seventh European Parliament ===
==== 2009 ====
The two major factions of the European Parliament, the EPP and the S&D, have reached a formal agreement to share the presidency under the 2009–2014 term. Under the agreement, Jerzy Buzek would be president in the first half of the term and a S&D member would be elected in the second half (2012–2014) of the term. Martin Schulz (SPD, Germany), leader of the S&D group, was speculated as the likely nominee, and in the event he was elected on 17 January 2012.

Buzek's presidency is part of the usual People's Party – Socialist agreement to have one presidency each of the two during each parliament. For the 2009–2014 term Buzek gets the post for the first term of office of two and a half years, and someone from the Socialists will get it for the second. The 2004–2009 parliamentary term saw a great amount of co-operation between the two groups following on from the 1999–2004 term which saw an EPP-ELDR alliance. The Socialist candidate would be Martin Schulz who was unanimously nominated by the group. Diana Wallis (Liberal) and Nirj Deva (Conservative) also announced candidacies.

Meanwhile, Graham Watson, the leader of ALDE, stated he wished to challenge this system of carving up the post, and presented himself as a candidate. He made a point of running a public campaign, to contrast against the closed-doors agreement of Peoples Party-Socialists, which he claimed was the first such campaign to be run. Through this, he also stated he hoped to open up a debate on the role of the president and make the figure more dynamic, to counterbalance the growing power of the presidency of the Council of the European Union. However, on 8 July 2009 Watson announced that he withdrew his candidacy thus leaving Buzek with only one opponent. The other official candidate was Eva-Britt Svensson, nominated from EUL-NGL. She campaigned with the slogan "a different voice". She was the first MEP from Sweden to candidate to the position.

In the first vote of the new Parliament Jerzy Buzek (EPP, Poland) was elected Parliament president, winning with 555 votes to 89 votes over his opponent Eva-Britt Svensson (EUL-NGL, Sweden).

=== Eighth European Parliament ===
==== 2017 ====
At the end of Martin Schulz's term, the presidency for the remainder of the eighth European Parliament (2014–2019) would have been due by convention to pass to an EPP member. However, the EPP–S&D agreement appeared broken, making it less certain that Antonio Tajani (EPP, Italy) would be elected president. The other contenders were Gianni Pittella (S&D, Italy), Guy Verhofstadt (ALDE, Belgium), Helga Stevens (ECR, Belgium), Eleonora Forenza (GUE/NGL, Italy) and Jean Lambert (Greens/EFA, UK). On 17 January 2017, Tajani was elected after four rounds of voting, following the withdrawal of Verhofstadt and declaration of support for the EPP candidate by the ALDE.

=== Ninth European Parliament ===
==== 2019 ====
The election of the president for the first half of the term of the Ninth European Parliament took place on 3 July 2019. David Sassoli (S&D, Italy) was elected as president in the 2nd round of voting.

Candidate		Group	Ballots	
Candidate		Group	1st Ballot	2nd Ballot
David Sassoli	ITA	S&D	325	345
Jan Zahradil	CZE	ECR	162	160
Ska Keller	GER	G/EFA	133	119
Sira Rego	ESP	GUE/NGL	42	43
Votes cast			662	667
Votes needed for election			332	334
Blank or void			73	37
Voted			735	704
Source: European Parliament News

==== 2022 ====
Following various periods of hospitalisation, David Sassoli died on 11 January 2022, one week before the expiry of his term. Roberta Metsola, as First Vice-President, became the acting president.

The election to choose Sassoli's successor took place as previously scheduled on 18 January 2022. The candidates were the acting president Roberta Metsola (EPP, Malta), Alice Bah Kuhnke (Greens/EFA, Sweden), Kosma Złotowski (ECR, Poland; withdrew before the vote), and Sira Rego (The Left, Spain). Metsola was elected in the first round of voting, having secured an absolute majority of 458 out of votes cast. On her election, Metsola became the youngest president ever, the first Maltese person to hold the office, and the first female president since 2002 (and only third female president ever).

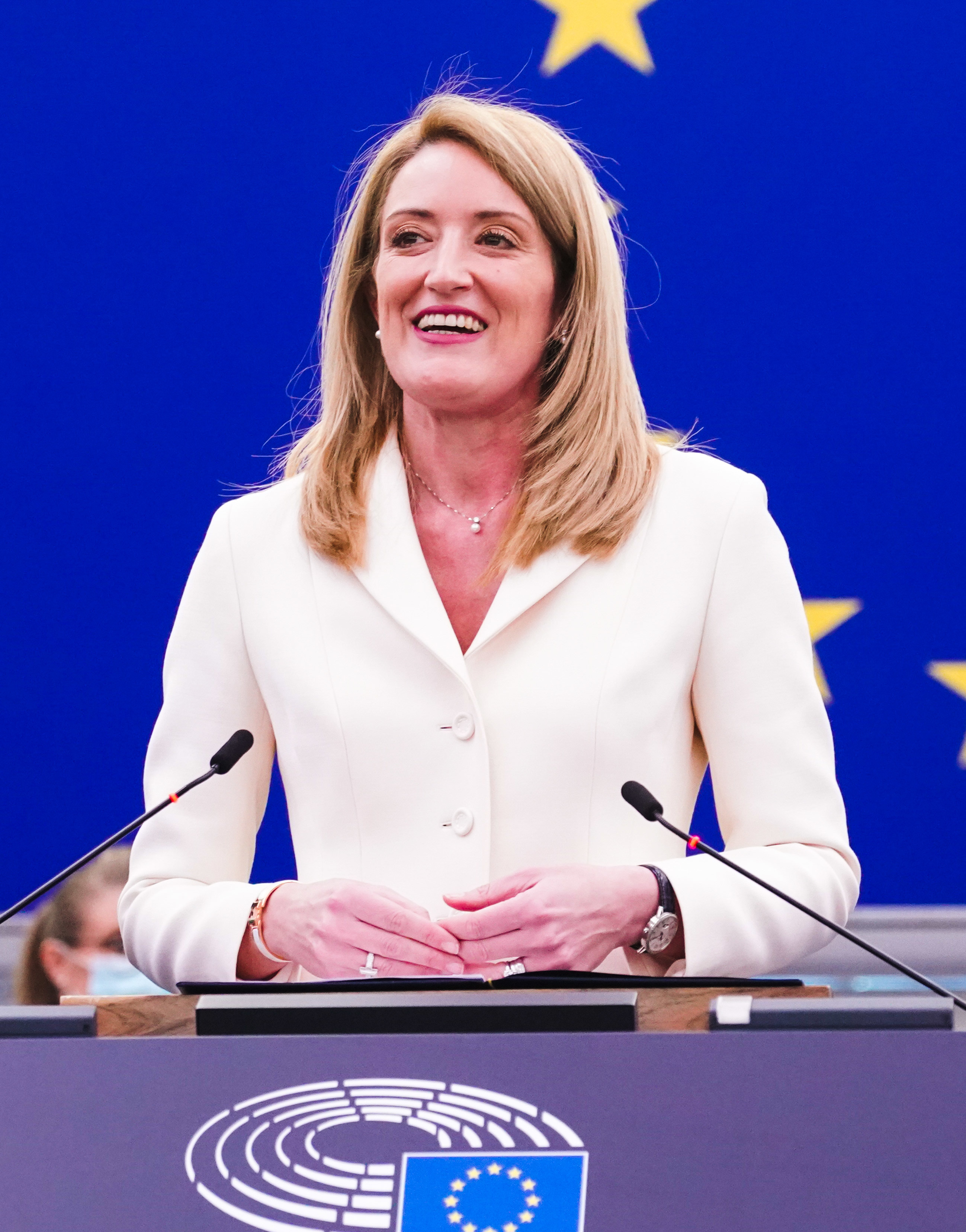
President of the European Parliament
Roberta Metsola (EPP) of Malta from 18 January 2022

Candidate		Group	Remote Ballots
Candidate		Group	1st Ballot
Roberta Metsola	MLT	EPP	458
Alice Bah Kuhnke	SWE	G/EFA	101
Sira Rego	ESP	GUE/NGL	57
Kosma Złotowski	POL	ECR	Withdrew (Note: Kosma Złotowski withdrew his candidacy at the beginning of the day's proceedings, prior to the election.)
Votes cast			616
Votes needed for election			309
Blank or void			74
Voted			690
Source: European Parliament News

=== Tenth European Parliament ===
==== 2024 ====
The election for the president of the Tenth European Parliament took place on 16 July 2024. Metsola was re-elected on the first ballot with the highest vote total ever for the office.

Candidate		Group	Ballots
Candidate		Group	1st Ballot
Roberta Metsola	MLT	EPP	562
Irene Montero	ESP	GUE/NGL	61
Votes cast			623
Votes needed for election			312
Blank or void			76
Voted			699
Source: European Parliament News

== List of officeholders ==
The list below includes all presidents as far back as 1952. However the Parliament is ambiguous about whether it sees continuity between the Common Assembly and the post-1958 European Communities Parliamentary Assembly. For example, the 50th anniversary of the European Parliament was celebrated in 2008, not 2002 (so Jerzy Buzek would be the 24th president, not the 28th). However, the official portraits of past presidents do start with the first president of the Common Assembly, Paul-Henri Spaak.

=== Presidents of the Common Assembly ===
N.	Portrait	President (Born–Died)	State	Took office	Left office	Party	Group	Electoral mandate	Ref.
1		Paul-Henri Spaak (1899–1972)	Belgium	11 September 1952	11 May 1954	PSB–BSP	Socialists	–	
1		Paul-Henri Spaak (1899–1972)	Belgium	1 year, 242 days		PSB–BSP	Socialists	–	
2		Alcide De Gasperi (1881–1954)	Italy	11 May 1954	19 August 1954 (Note: Died in office)	DC	Christian Democrats	–	
2		Alcide De Gasperi (1881–1954)	Italy	100 days		DC	Christian Democrats	–	
3		Giuseppe Pella (1902–1981)	Italy	29 November 1954	27 November 1956	DC	Christian Democrats	–	
3		Giuseppe Pella (1902–1981)	Italy	1 year, 364 days		DC	Christian Democrats	–	
4		Hans Furler (1904–1975)	West Germany	27 November 1956	19 March 1958	CDU	Christian Democrats	–	
4		Hans Furler (1904–1975)	West Germany	1 year, 112 days		CDU	Christian Democrats	–	

=== Presidents of the Parliamentary Assembly ===
N.	Portrait	President (Born–Died)	State	Took office	Left office	Party	Group	Electoral mandate	Ref.
1		Robert Schuman (1886–1963)	France	19 March 1958	18 March 1960	MRP	Christian Democrats	–	
1		Robert Schuman (1886–1963)	France	1 year, 365 days		MRP	Christian Democrats	–	
2		Hans Furler (1904–1975)	West Germany	18 March 1960	27 March 1962	CDU	Christian Democrats	–	
2		Hans Furler (1904–1975)	West Germany	2 years, 9 days		CDU	Christian Democrats	–	

=== Presidents of the appointed Parliament ===
N.	Portrait	President (Born–Died)	State	Took office	Left office	Party	Group	Electoral mandate	Ref.
1		Gaetano Martino (1900–1967)	Italy	27 March 1962	21 March 1964	PLI	Liberals	–	
1		Gaetano Martino (1900–1967)	Italy	1 year, 360 days		PLI	Liberals	–	
2		Jean Duvieusart (1900–1977)	Belgium	21 March 1964	24 September 1965	PSC–CVP	Christian Democrats	–	
2		Jean Duvieusart (1900–1977)	Belgium	1 year, 187 days		PSC–CVP	Christian Democrats	–	
3		Victor Leemans (1901–1971)	Belgium	24 September 1965	7 March 1966	PSC–CVP	Christian Democrats	–	
3		Victor Leemans (1901–1971)	Belgium	164 days		PSC–CVP	Christian Democrats	–	
4		Alain Poher (1909–1996)	France	7 March 1966	11 March 1969	MRP	Christian Democrats	–	
4		Alain Poher (1909–1996)	France	3 years, 4 days		MRP	Christian Democrats	–	
5		Mario Scelba (1901–1991)	Italy	11 March 1969	9 March 1971	DC	Christian Democrats	–	
5		Mario Scelba (1901–1991)	Italy	1 year, 363 days		DC	Christian Democrats	–	
6		Walter Behrendt (1914–1997)	West Germany	9 March 1971	13 March 1973	SPD	Socialists	–	
6		Walter Behrendt (1914–1997)	West Germany	2 years, 4 days		SPD	Socialists	–	
7		Cees Berkhouwer (1919–1992)	Netherlands	13 March 1973	11 March 1975	VVD	Liberals	–	
7		Cees Berkhouwer (1919–1992)	Netherlands	1 year, 363 days		VVD	Liberals	–	
8		Georges Spénale (1913–1983)	France	11 March 1975	8 March 1977	PS	Socialists	–	
8		Georges Spénale (1913–1983)	France	1 year, 362 days		PS	Socialists	–	
9		Emilio Colombo (1920–2013)	Italy	8 March 1977	17 July 1979	DC	Christian Democrats	–	
9		Emilio Colombo (1920–2013)	Italy	2 years, 131 days		DC	Christian Democrats	–	

=== Presidents of the elected Parliament ===
N.	Portrait	President (Born–Died)	State	Took office	Left office	Party	Group	Election	Ref.
1		Simone Veil (1927–2017)	France	17 July 1979	19 January 1982	UDF	Liberal Democrats	1979	
1		Simone Veil (1927–2017)	France	2 years, 186 days		UDF	Liberal Democrats	1979	
2		Piet Dankert (1934–2003)	Netherlands	19 January 1982	24 July 1984	PvdA	Socialists	1979	
2		Piet Dankert (1934–2003)	Netherlands	2 years, 187 days		PvdA	Socialists	1979	
3		Pierre Pflimlin (1907–2000)	France	24 July 1984	20 January 1987	UDF / RPR	European People's Party	1984	
3		Pierre Pflimlin (1907–2000)	France	2 years, 180 days		UDF / RPR	European People's Party	1984	
4		C. Henry Plumb (1925–2022)	United Kingdom	20 January 1987	25 July 1989	Conservative	European Democrats	1984	
4		C. Henry Plumb (1925–2022)	United Kingdom	2 years, 186 days		Conservative	European Democrats	1984	
5		Enrique Barón Crespo (born 1944)	Spain	25 July 1989	21 January 1992	PSOE	Socialists	1989	
5		Enrique Barón Crespo (born 1944)	Spain	2 years, 180 days		PSOE	Socialists	1989	
6		Egon Klepsch (1930–2010)	Germany	21 January 1992	19 July 1994	CDU	European People's Party	1989	
6		Egon Klepsch (1930–2010)	Germany	2 years, 179 days		CDU	European People's Party	1989	
7		Klaus Hänsch (1938–2026)	Germany	19 July 1994	14 January 1997	SPD	Socialists	1994	
7		Klaus Hänsch (1938–2026)	Germany	2 years, 186 days		SPD	Socialists	1994	
8		José María Gil-Robles (1935–2023)	Spain	14 January 1997	20 July 1999	PP	European People's Party	1994	
8		José María Gil-Robles (1935–2023)	Spain	2 years, 187 days		PP	European People's Party	1994	
9		Nicole Fontaine (1942–2018)	France	20 July 1999	15 January 2002	UMP	European People's Party	1999	
9		Nicole Fontaine (1942–2018)	France	2 years, 179 days		UMP	European People's Party	1999	
10		Pat Cox (born 1952)	Ireland	15 January 2002	20 July 2004	Independent	Liberal Democrats	1999	
10		Pat Cox (born 1952)	Ireland	2 years, 187 days		Independent	Liberal Democrats	1999	
11		Josep Borrell (born 1947)	Spain	20 July 2004	16 January 2007	PSOE	Socialists	2004	
11		Josep Borrell (born 1947)	Spain	2 years, 180 days		PSOE	Socialists	2004	
12		Hans-Gert Pöttering (born 1945)	Germany	16 January 2007	14 July 2009	CDU	European People's Party	2004	
12		Hans-Gert Pöttering (born 1945)	Germany	2 years, 179 days		CDU	European People's Party	2004	
13		Jerzy Buzek (born 1940)	Poland	14 July 2009	17 January 2012	PO	European People's Party	2009	
13		Jerzy Buzek (born 1940)	Poland	2 years, 187 days		PO	European People's Party	2009	
14		Martin Schulz (born 1955)	Germany	17 January 2012	17 January 2017	SPD	Socialists & Democrats	2009	
14		Martin Schulz (born 1955)	Germany	5 years, 0 days		SPD	Socialists & Democrats	2014	
15		Antonio Tajani (born 1953)	Italy	17 January 2017	3 July 2019	FI	European People's Party	2014	
15		Antonio Tajani (born 1953)	Italy	2 years, 167 days		FI	European People's Party	2014	
16		David Sassoli (1956–2022)	Italy	3 July 2019	11 January 2022	PD	Socialists & Democrats	2019	
16		David Sassoli (1956–2022)	Italy	2 years, 192 days		PD	Socialists & Democrats	2019	
Roberta Metsola was Interim President from 11 to 18 January 2022.								2019	
17		Roberta Metsola (born 1979)	Malta	18 January 2022	Incumbent	PN	European People's Party	2019	
17		Roberta Metsola (born 1979)	Malta	4 years, 232 days		PN	European People's Party	2024	

== See also ==
- Vice-President of the European Parliament
- List of presidents of the institutions of the European Union
  - President of the European Council
  - President of the European Commission
  - Presidency of the Council of the European Union
- President of the European Union
- Speaker (politics)
