= Luigi Negri =

Luigi Negri may refer to:

- Luigi Negri (bassist) (1837–1891), Italian double bassist
- Luigi Negri (bishop) (1941–2021), archbishop of the Roman Catholic Archdiocese of Ferrara-Comacchio, from 2012 to 2017
- Luigi Negri (politician) (born 1956), Italian politician for Lega Lombarda–Lega Nord
