= Clodoveo =

Clodoveo is an Italian and Spanish masculine given name, equivalent to English Clovis. Other Italian names sharing the same origin are Luigi, Ludovico, Lodovico, Aloisio, Alvise and Aligi. People and characters with the given name include:

== People ==
- Clodoveo Carrión Mora (1883–1957), Ecuadorian palaeontologist and naturalist
- Clodoveo Ferri (born 1947), Italian medical researcher

== Fictional characters ==
- Clodoveo, a multilingual parrot in the Alan Ford comics
- Clodoveo, one of the three main characters in the Chicha, Tato y Clodoveo comics
