= Klaus Hänsch =

German politician (1938–2026)

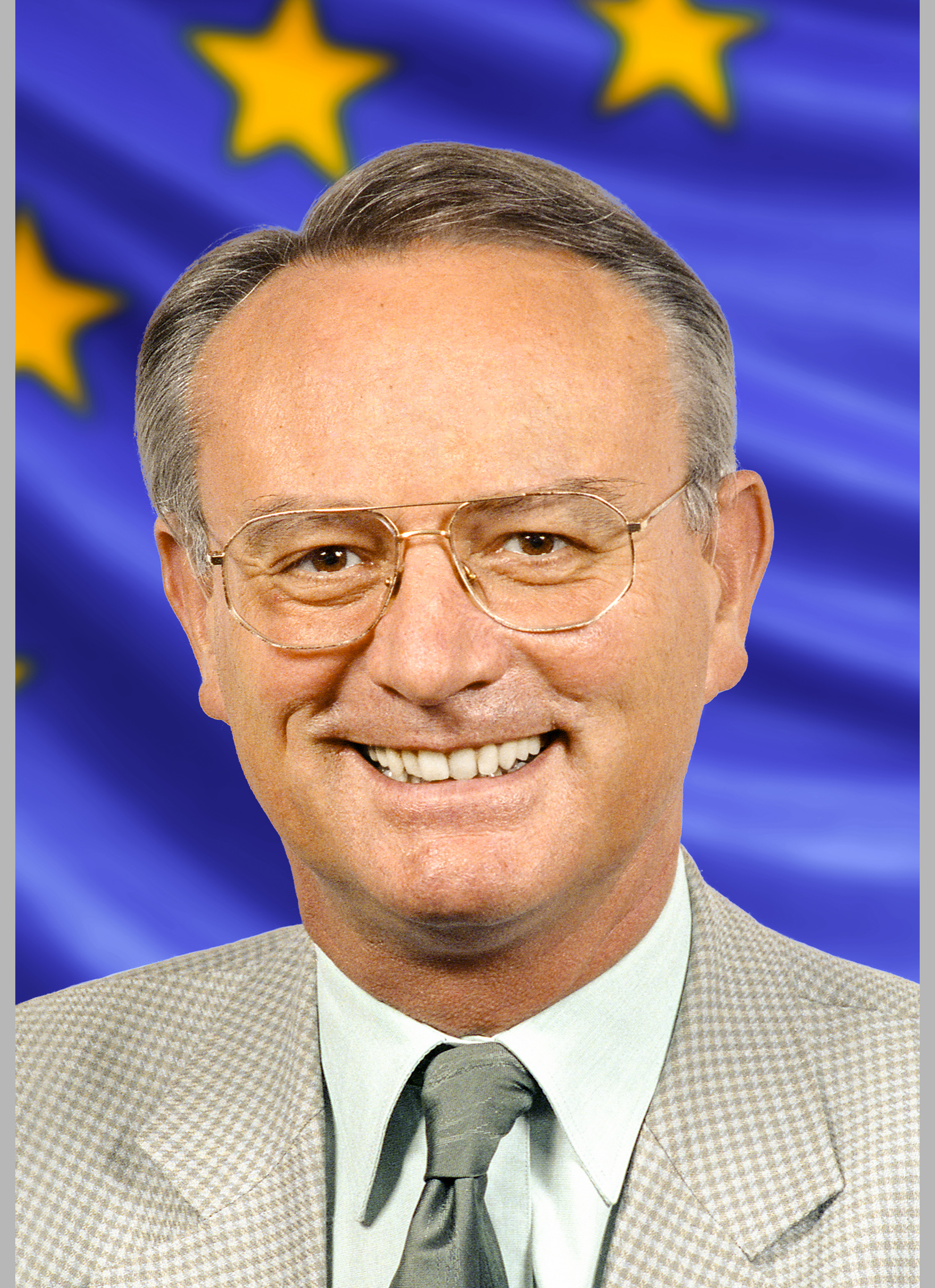
- Official portrait, 1994

President of the European Parliament
- In office 19 July 1994 – 14 January 1997
- Preceded by: Egon Klepsch
- Succeeded by: José María Gil-Robles

Personal details
- Born: 15 December 1938 Sprottau, Gau Lower Silesia, Germany (modern Szprotawa, Poland)
- Died: 4 August 2026 (aged 87) Erkrath, North Rhine-Westphalia, Germany
- Party: SPD, PES

Klaus Hänsch (15 December 1938 – 4 August 2026) was a German politician. He served as President of the European Parliament from 1994 to 1997.

Hänsch was a Member of the European Parliament representing the SPD from 17 July 1979 until 13 July 2009 and sat with the Party of European Socialists group. He was vice-chairman of the PES group from 1989 until 2009, except during his time as President of the European Parliament.

Hänsch died in Erkrath, Germany on 4 August 2026, at the age of 87.
