= Luigi Rosselli =

Italian born architect (born 1957)

Luigi Rosselli is an Italian born architect who practices in Australia. He was born in Milan in 1957. Coming from a long line of engineers, he studied architecture at the Ecole Politechnique Federale in Lausanne, where he met Alvaro Siza and Mario Botta, who offered Rosselli a job in 1979. He left the next year to work for Mitchell/Giurgola in their New York office at the age of 23. That firm won a commission to design the Australian Parliament House, and Rosselli moved to Canberra in 1981 to work on that project. He met his wife there, and the two of them moved to Sydney in 1984. A year later he joined Furio Valich's firm, then opened his practice a year later. When he founded his Sydney practice in 1985, he developed a ritual of showing his freehand design concept sketches using black felt pens and white Tipp Ex (correcting fluid) on translucent yellow tracing paper, torn from small rolls.

In 1989, two musicians from INXS contacted him to design their houses. One was a bush house on the Hawkesbury River, the other was an addition to a 1930s brick duplex. They were published in 1191 in Vogue Living and Architect Australia.

His work has primarily been residential, but in the 1990s he worked on a series of restaurants. His approach to architecture is "humanist, where people and environment take precedence over preconceived design dogmas" and his main concern is designing for the humans: for their daily lives, for the human senses, for the psychology of the users, to create a sense of comfort and satisfaction and aiming for the "Architecture of Happiness"

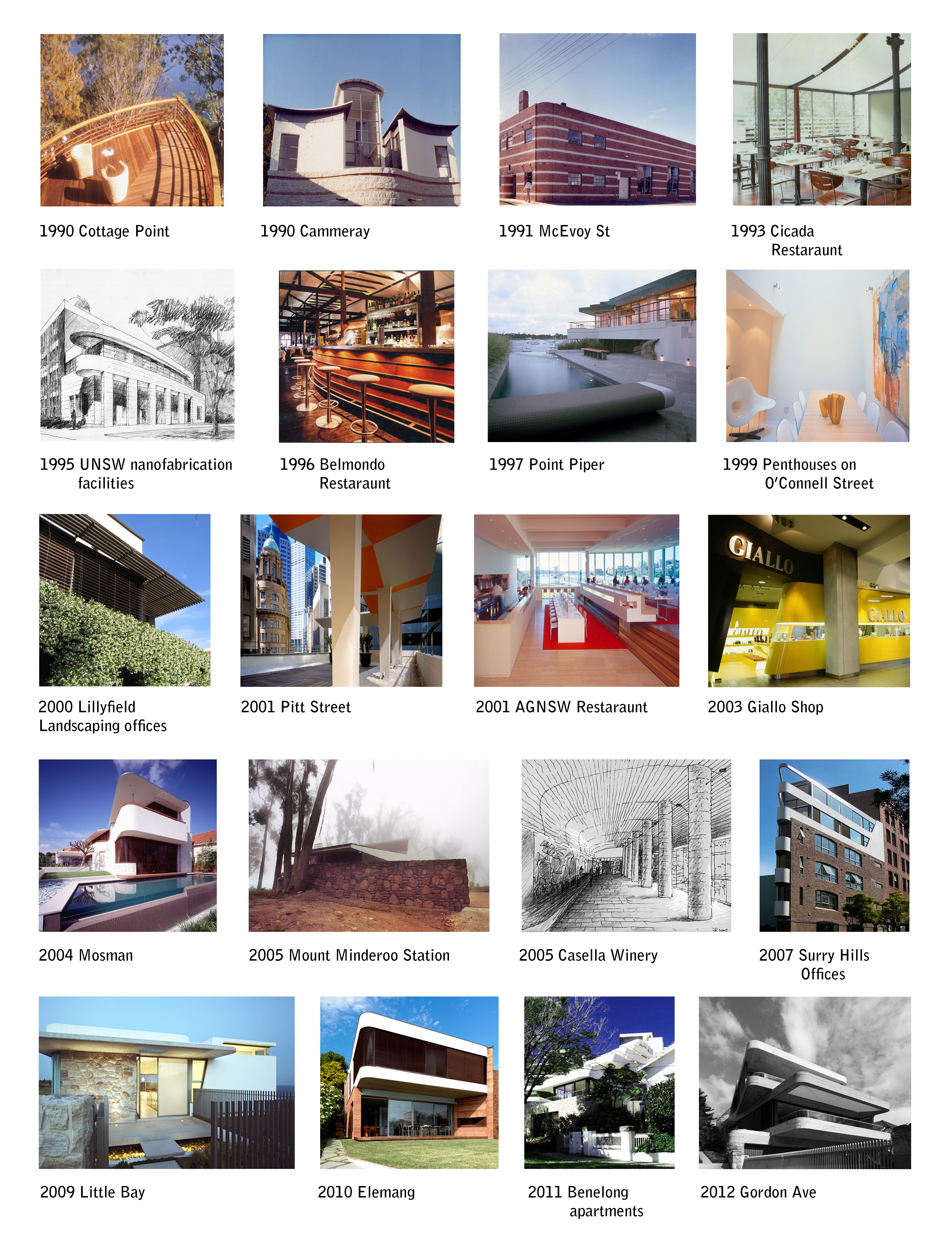
Timeline of Luigi Rosselli's designs from 1990-2012

Family homes like The Books House, which is a series of stacked terrace platforms following the steep sandstone topography of Sydney's northern shore. Or the five-bedroom Curraghbeena House that languors along the serpentine shoreline of Mosman Bay and sold at auction in 2016 for a reported $12 million. To this end, many of the projects exhibit a seamless transition between old and new, achieving balance so the outcome is simply a better version of what it once was.

The Great Wall of WA an ambitious structure featuring 12 musterers' quarters built into a sand dune in the Pilbara region, won several awards such as the Terra Awards Architizer A+ Awards & Archdaily Building of the Year.

In 2004, a house he designed in Mosman won a commendation from the Royal Australian Institute of Architects (AIA), and in 2006, he shared the AIA's NSW Wilkinson residential award for a farmhouse in Mount Minderoo, near Mittagong.

The Luigi Rosselli Architects team work out of The Beehive Design Studio in the Sydney suburb of Surry Hills. Its honeycomb facade was a joint effort with his architect son Raffaello Rosselli, who is also interested in sustainability and re-use. Luigi Rosselli Architects is a carbon neutral practice applying sustainable building practises, as demonstrated by their expertise in rammed earth, air-conditioning-free spaces and energy efficiency.

Other award winning projects include, the Triplex Apartments, Homage to Oscar, Heritage Treasure Chest

In 2015, Luigi Rosselli published a compilation of his hand drawn designs. Titled 'A Perspective: 30-year of Sketches by Luigi Rosselli Architect', the exhibition features more than 1,000 of Rosselli's translucent yellow illustrations as a veil of 'windswept leaves' layered through a sculpted and internally lit portal that visitors may walk through.
