= Egon Klepsch =

German politician (1930 - 2010)

Egon Alfred Klepsch
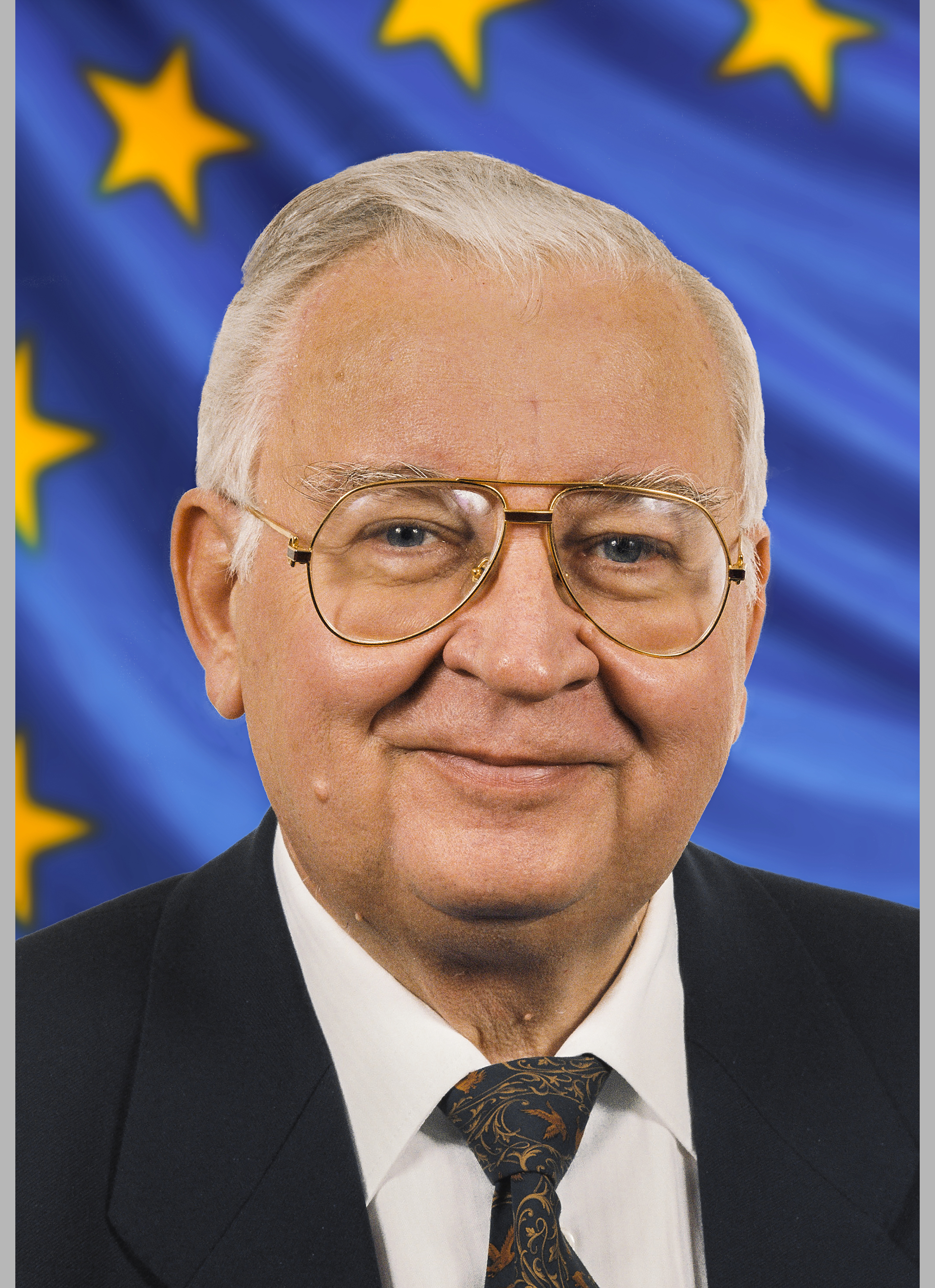
- Official portrait, 1992

President of the European Parliament
- In office 31 January 1992 – 19 July 1994
- Preceded by: Enrique Barón Crespo
- Succeeded by: Klaus Hänsch

Personal details
- Born: 30 January 1930 Bodenbach (Podmokly), Czechoslovakia
- Died: 18 September 2010 (aged 80) Koblenz, Germany
- Party: CDU, EPP

Egon Alfred Klepsch (30 January 1930 – 18 September 2010) was a German politician (CDU).

In the years 1963–1969, Klepsch was Federal leader of the Junge Union. In 1965 he worked briefly as an election campaign manager for Ludwig Erhard. In the same year, he was elected to the German Bundestag, to which he belonged until 1980.

From 1964, Klepsch had been active at the European level. From 1973 he was a Member of the European Parliament in parallel to the Bundestag. After the first direct election of the parliament in 1979 Klepsch became chairman of the European People's Party (EPP) parliamentary group. After he had stood in vain in 1982 for the office of President of the European Parliament, he was elected in 1992 with the support of the EPP and Party of European Socialists parliamentary groups. In 1994 he retired from the European Parliament and became an advisor to Deutschen Vermögensberatungs AG.

== Honours ==
=== Foreign honours ===
- Malta : Honorary Companion of Honour of the National Order of Merit (25 March 1994)
