= Luigi Diamante =

Italian painter (1904–1971)

Luigi Diamante (1904–1971) was an Italian painter and draftsman. He taught for many years in the city of Udine in northeastern, Italy.

== Biography ==
Diamante studied at the College of Arts of Venice while working as designer in an architectural firm. In that period he did a series of studies of buildings and monuments in Udine, some of them dated 1922.

His first designs and oil paintings date back to the second half of the 1920s. In 1934 he became famous for participating in various "Mostre Sindicali d'Arte," syndicated exhibitions of arts, acting on some executive committees. In 1939 he worked on the decoration of the apse of the church of Nogaredo di Prato. In 1944 he worked with the architect Toso on the architectural survey of the main monumental buildings of Udine to evaluate damage resulting from the anticipated bombardments. In 1946 he worked on the decoration of the facades of the Manzano and Soleschiano churches.

From 1947 until his death he taught drawing at the A. Manzoni Middle School in the city. During the '50s and '60s he continued to paint and travelled the country and in Germany and Austria in 1962 in the footsteps of the painter Tiepolo and France in 1964 in those of the Impressionists. From these travels he left a large amount of documentation in the form of sketches and drawings. He also continued to exhibit his works.

Since his death he has left more than 400 oil paintings and several hundreds of works in various techniques (including watercolor paintings, tempera, pastel, and drawings).
