= Luigi Mascelli =

Italian goldsmith

Luigi Mascelli (1804-1825) was an Italian goldsmith from Rome. He designed decorative boxes, one of which is held at the Victoria and Albert Museum in London. In 1998, one of his boxes was sold for over $7,000 at a Christie's auction. A decade later, at a 2008 auction held at Sotheby's, one of his boxes was sold for over $40,000.
