= Walter Behrendt =

German politician

MdB Walter Behrendt MEP
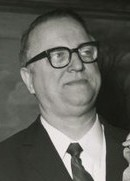
- Behrendt in 1972

Member of the Bundestag
- In office 1957–1976
- Constituency: Dortmund III

Vice-President of the European Parliament
- In office 1969–1971
- In office 1973–1977

9th President of the European Parliament
- In office 16 March 1971 – 1973
- Preceded by: Mario Scelba
- Succeeded by: Cornelis Berkhouwer

Personal details
- Born: September 18, 1914 Dortmund, German Empire
- Died: July 23, 1997 (aged 82) Dortmund, West Germany
- Party: SPD (1932-1997)

Walter Behrendt (German pronunciation: [ˈvaltɐ ˈbeːʁɛnt]; 18 September 1914 – 23 July 1997) was a German politician of the Social Democratic Party (SPD) and president of the European Parliament (1971–1973).

== Career ==
Behrendt was trained as a merchant and accountant. He took part in World War II and afterwards worked as clerk in an industrial firm. In 1954 he became a contributor to the company journal of Hoesch-Westfalenhütte AG in Dortmund. Behrendt joined SPD in 1932 being a member of the Socialist Working Youth (Sozialistische Arbeiterjugend). From 1945 to 1947 he was chairman of the regional Socialist Youth for Dortmund, Lünen and Castrop-Rauxel. He was chairman of the SPD branch in Dortmund-Altenderne in 1951/52 and in Dortmund from 1952 to 1955.

From 1952 until his death, Behrendt was a municipal councillor in Dortmund. In 1957 he was elected member of the Bundestag (electoral constituency: Dortmund III) and remained in office until 1976. Between 1961 and 1967 he was assistant chairman of the Labour Committee. Additionally, Behrendt was a member of the European Parliament from 1967 to 1977 where he served as vice-president (1969–71, 1973–77) and president (1971–73). He was one of the signers of the Humanist Manifesto in 1973.

Behrendt was also a member of the supervisory board of Dortmunder Stadtwerke AG and Dortmunder Hafen und Eisenbahn AG.
