= Georges Spénale =

French writer, poet and politician

Georges Spénale MEP
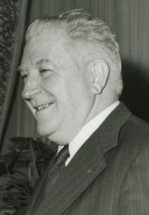
- Spénale in 1976

11th President of the European Parliament
- In office 11 March 1975 – 8 March 1977
- Preceded by: Cornelis Berkhouwer
- Succeeded by: Emilio Colombo

Personal details
- Born: November 29, 1913 Carcassonne, France
- Died: August 20, 1983 (aged 69) Paris, France

Georges Spénale (French pronunciation: [ʒɔʁʒ spenal]; 29 November 1913, Carcassonne – 20 August 1983 at Pitié-Salpêtrière Hospital, Paris) was a French official and politician. He was the president of the European Parliament from 11 March 1975 to 1977. He was also a member of the National Assembly for Tarn from 1962 to 1977, and a Senator for Tarn from 1977 to 1983.
