= Luigia =

Luigia is an Italian feminine given name. Notable people with the name include:

- Luigia Abbadia (1821–1896), Italian operatic mezzo-soprano
- Luigia Carlucci Aiello (born 1946), Italian computer scientist, emeritus professor
- Luigia Boccabadati (1800–1850), Italian operatic soprano
- Luigia Bonfanti (1907–1973), Italian sprinter and long jumper
- (Candida) Luigia Bozzini (fl. 19th century), Italian painter
- Luigia Coccia, Italian Catholic nun and missionary
- Luigia Gonzaga (1458–1542), Italian noblewoman
- Luigia Massari (1810–1898), Italian painter and embroiderer
- Luigia Bosisio Mauri (born 1936), known as Liù Bosisio, Italian actress and voice actress
- Luigia de' Medici (Luisa; 1477 – 1488), Italian noble
- Luigia Pascoli (1805–1882), Italian painter
- Luigia Poloni (1802–1855), Italian Catholic religious sister
- Luigia Polzelli (Polcelli; c. 1760 – 5 October 1830), Italian mezzo-soprano
- Luigia Sanfelice (Luisa; 1764–1800), Italian aristocrat

== See also ==
- Luigia Cattaneo-Gentile, a portrait painting by Anthony van Dyck
- Convitto Nazionale Maria Luigia, a state school in Parma, Italy
- Maria Luigia Borsi, Italian opera singer
