= Luigi Negri (bassist) =

Luigi Negri (1837–1891) was an Italian double bass virtuoso of the romantic era and the principal bassist at La Scala. Known mostly during his lifetime as a conductor of opera, Negri's reputation as a double bassist has long been overshadowed by his contemporary, Giovanni Bottesini.

Negri's concert works remained unpublished during his lifetime and for a long time afterwards. In fact, it was not until 2005 that some of Negri's concert works appeared in print, after the discovery of the scores by Remo Ricci. These concert works for double bass are published by ISG Publications (USA),
