= Luigi Mocenigo =

Luigi Mocenigo may refer to:

- Alvise I Mocenigo, doge of Venice 1570–1577
- Alvise II Mocenigo, doge of Venice 1700–1709
