= Luigi Attademo =

Italian musician

Luigi Attademo is an Italian classical guitarist born in Naples in 1972.

He worked in the archive of the Fundación Andrés Segovia (in Linares, Jaén, Spain), where he discovered some unknown manuscripts of important composers, such as Jaume Pahissa, Alexandre Tansman, Gaspar Cassadò and others.
