= Luigina =

Luigina is a feminine Italian given name. Notable people with the name include:

- Luigina Bissoli (born 1956), Italian cyclist
- Luigina Giavotti (1916–1976), Italian gymnast
- Luigina Perversi (1914–1983), Italian gymnast
