= Luigino =

Luigino is an Italian masculine given name. Notable people with the name include:

- Luigino Moro (born 1956), Italian cyclist
- Luigino Vascon (1956–2022), Italian politician
- Luigino Rinaldi (born c. 1947), Italian-Canadian politician (Lou)
- Luigino Celestino di Agostino (born 1967), Italian DJ and music producer (Gigi)
