= Cornelis Berkhouwer =

Dutch politician (1919–1992)

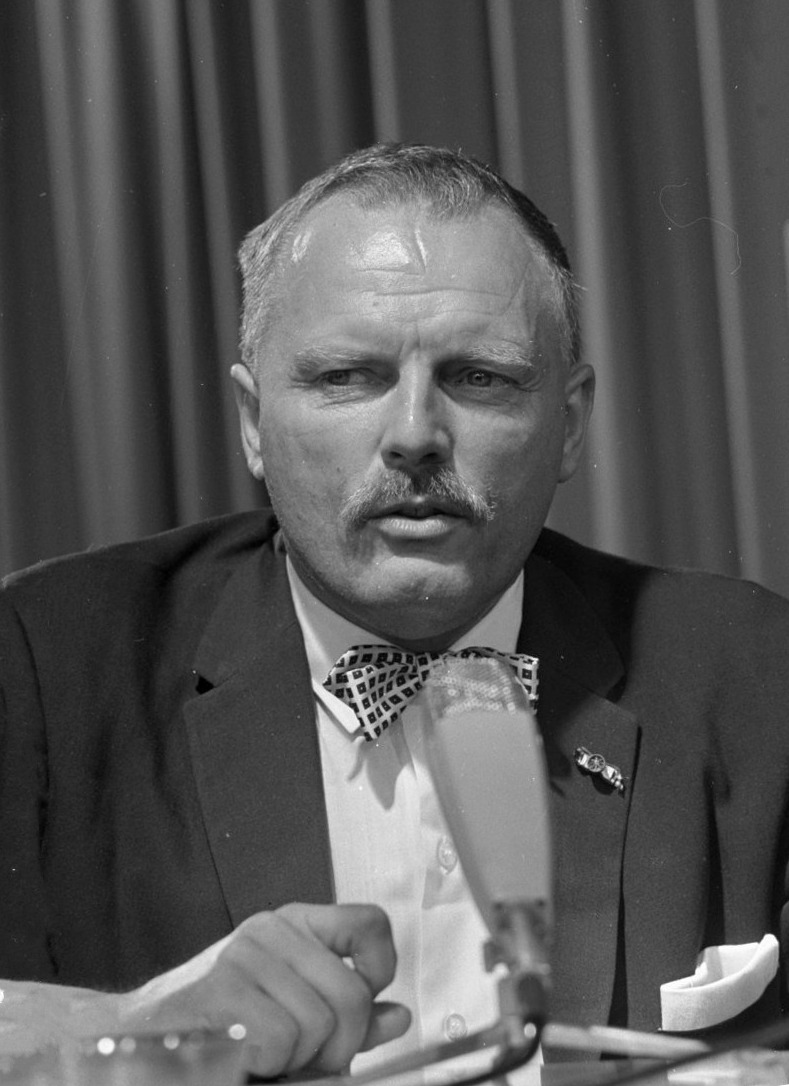
- Berkhouwer in 1968

Member of the Municipal Council of Alkmaar
- In office 1949–1961

Member of the House of Representatives
- In office 1956–1979

Member of the European Parliament
- In office 1963–1984

10th President of the European Parliament
- In office 1973 – March 11, 1975
- Preceded by: Walter Behrendt
- Succeeded by: Georges Spenale

Personal details
- Born: 19 March 1919 Alkmaar, Netherlands
- Died: 5 October 1992 (aged 73) Alkmaar, Netherlands
- Citizenship: Netherlands; European Union
- Party: VVD; European Liberal Democrats

Cornelis "Cees" Berkhouwer (Dutch pronunciation: [kɔrˈneːlɪz ˈbɛr(ə)kˌɦʌuər], 19 March 1919 – 5 October 1992) was a Dutch politician.

He was a Member of the European Parliament between 1964 and 1984, for the Dutch People's Party for Freedom and Democracy, which sat as part of the Liberal Democrat group in the Parliament. Between 13 March 1973 and 10 March 1975, he served as President of the European Parliament.

He was one of the signatories of the agreement to convene a convention for drafting a world constitution. As a result, for the first time in human history, a World Constituent Assembly convened to draft and adopt the Constitution for the Federation of Earth.
