= Luigi Martinelli (engineer) =

Italian aeronautical engineer, mechanical engineer, and professor

- Occupations: Professor, Engineer
- Title: Professor
- Awards: AIAA Associate Fellow

Academic background
- Education: Politecnico di Milano, Princeton University
- Alma mater: Princeton University
- Doctoral advisor: Antony Jameson

Luigi Martinelli is an Italian aeronautical engineer, mechanical engineer, and currently a professor of mechanical and aerospace engineering at Princeton University.

Martinelli is known for his work in aerodynamics, computational science, and engineering design pertaining to a variety of vehicles and aircraft. He has also made some contributions to the development of computational fluid dynamics methods with his former adviser Antony Jameson at Princeton.

Martinelli is an associate fellow of the American Institute for Aeronautics and Astronautics (AIAA).
