= Luigi Melchiorre =

Italian sculptor

Luigi Melchiorre (Valenza, Kingdom of Sardinia, 1859 - After 1908) was an Italian sculptor.

== Biography ==
Melchiorre first studied at the Accademia Albertina in Turin, then traveled to Florence and finally to Rome to work under Giacomo Ginotti (1845 - 1897). He moved back to reside in Turin.

In 1881 in Milan he sculpted a plaster monument depicting the Genius of Columbus, a bust of King Umberto I and a statuette titled Il micino. In 1883 in Rome he displayed La scritta nuziale and The wife of Claudius. In 1884 in Turin he exhibited a marble statuette titled L'importuno and a bust depicting Mary Magdalene. In 1886 he exhibited la Pieta and Vinsi. In 1887 in Turin Cleopatra and Luce ed Arte; at the 1888 Zootecnica, In Processione; in 1889, Giuseppe Garibaldi and San Giovanni; in 1890, La Cantoniera and Portatrices d'acqua; in 1891, Lylium puritatis, and in 1892, Tibicino. In 1893, he exhibited: Rosa Mistica, Battle of Dogali, a portrait of Benvenuto Cellini, Wife of Lot, Primavera della vita, and La Musa di Verdi.

He completed a number of monuments, including one dedicated to the Duke of Genoa for the Venaria Reale, a Monument to Garibaldi erected in Valenza, the funereal monument of Comm. Scavia in Castellazzo Bormida (Province of Alessandria), and that of Signor Vaccari in Valenza, and of the Soldiers Fallen in Africa erected in the town of Valenza. His sculptures of Saint Alessandro, Carlo, Siro and Louis decorate the facade of Santi Alessandro e Carlo in Alessandria. He continued to exhibit till 1908.
