= Luigi Cacciatore =

Italian politician (1900–1951)

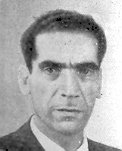

Minister of Posts and Communications
- In office 1947–1947
- Prime Minister: Alcide De Gasperi

Personal details
- Born: 26 July 1900 Mercato San Severino, Kingdom of Italy
- Died: 17 August 1951 (aged 51) Rome, Italy
- Party: Italian Socialist Party of Proletarian Unity; Italian Socialist Party

Luigi Cacciatore (1900–1951) was an Italian socialist politician who served as the minister of posts and communications in 1947. He was a member and one of the leaders of the Italian Socialist Party.

== Biography ==
Cacciatore was born in Mercato San Severino, near Salerno, on 26 July 1900. From 1922 he worked in the building trade unions. In 1925 he was arrested by the Fascist regime due to his activities. After the end of the Fascist rule he involved in politics. In the first meeting of the Italian Socialist Party of Proletarian Unity in Naples on 20 December 1943 he was elected to its National Council representing the province of Salerno. He was appointed minister of posts and communications to the third cabinet of Prime Minister Alcide De Gasperi in 1947. Then Cacciatore joined the Italian Socialist Party. He was elected to the Italian Parliament from Benevento and represented the party at the parliament between 1 June 1948 to 17 August 1951. He died in Rome on 17 August 1951. Spencer M. Di Scala argues that the death of Cacciatore weakened the Italian Socialist Party.
