= Luigi Frati =

Italian academic physician

Luigi Frati (born 10 April 1943) is an Italian academic physician and rector of the Sapienza University of Rome.

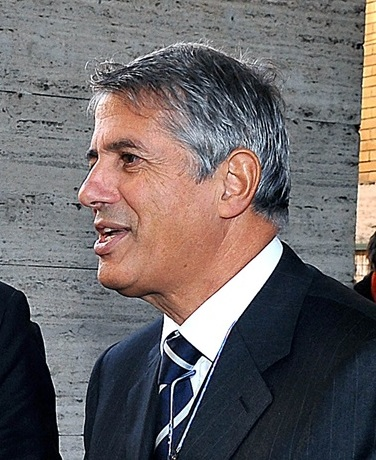

Frati was born in Siena in 1943 and studied in Milan where he obtained a B.A. in medicine from the Università Cattolica del Sacro Cuore. He became known for his research activity in studies relating to the analysis of a protein that facilitates the proliferation of cells in the epidermis. Later he became a full professor at Sapienza and was made chair of general pathology in its faculty of medicine. He was a member of the Consiglio Universitario Nazionale (‘National University Council’) from 1980 to 1998, and was dean of his faculty for the 16–18 years leading up to 2008. On 3 October 2008 he was elected rector of the university.

== Nepotism allegations ==
Frati has come under fire for nepotism because of three members of his family holding chairs in the same university . According to a BBC report: "Professor Frati has [...] overseen the promotion of his wife from being a local high school history teacher, to becoming Professor of Medical History. His daughter also gained a post as Professor of Legal Medicine - without any specific medical education. And his son was made an associate professor in cardiology aged just 31, one of the youngest Italians to gain such an appointment."

Preceded by Renato Guarini	Rectors of the Sapienza University of Rome; 2008–	Succeeded by [incumbent]
