= Rotaldo =

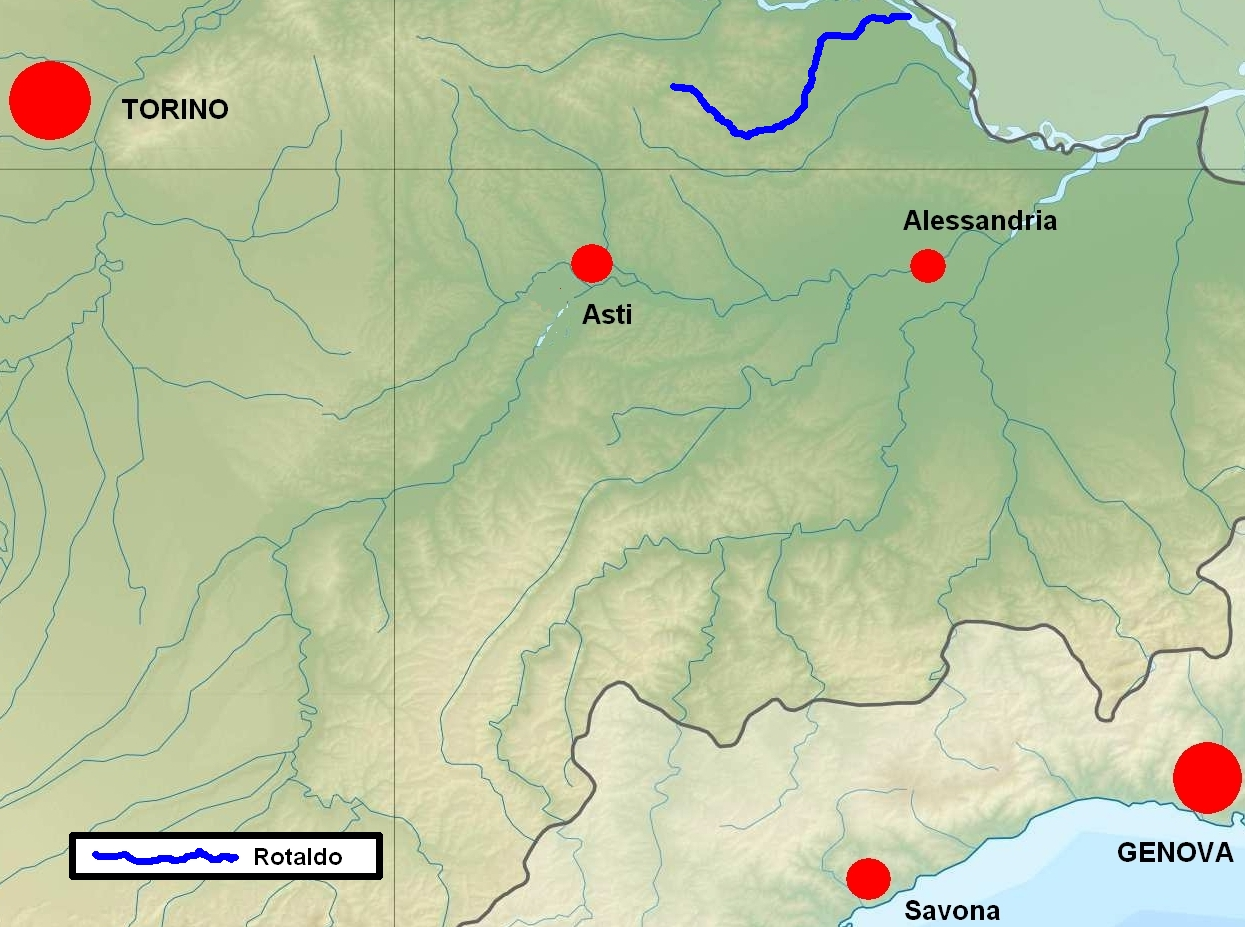
- Location within southern Piedmont

Location
- Country: Italy

Physical characteristics
- Source
  - location: near Grazzano Badoglio (Province of Asti)
  - elevation: 264 m (866 ft)
- Mouth
  - location: Po near Valmacca (Province of Alessandria)
  - coordinates: 45.0812°N 8.6119°E
- Length: 40 km (25 mi)
- Discharge
  - average: 1.6 m^{3}/s (57 cu ft/s)

Basin features
- Progression: Po→ Adriatic Sea

The Rotaldo, known in its upper course as the Laio, is a 40-kilometre (25 mi) river (classified as a torrente) of northern Italy, and a right-side tributary of the Po River. Most of its course falls within the Province of Alessandria and all of it within the former Province of Casale. The river is of modest flow and is heavily reliant on rainfall with a discharge near its mouth of 1.6 cubic metres per second (57 cu ft/s).

The river is born on the slopes of Madonna dei Monti near Grazzano Badoglio in the Province of Asti, close to one of the springs of the Grana del Monferrato. Its early course makes an arc through the hills of the Basso Monferrato, heading first west-southwest before curving gradually to west-northwest. It receives waters from a number of small streams to its left and passes through the communes of Olivola and between Vignale Monferrato and Frassinello Monferrato. At Roncaglia, it is joined at the left by a second branch whose main source is in the hills near Ottiglio; this second branch has been joined by streams rising in Sala Monferrato, Cella Monte, and Rosignano Monferrato. From the right, it receives streams arising in Camagna Monferrato and Conzano. At San Maurizio (near Occimiano), it is joined from the left by a further branch with origins near Terruggia. Entering the Casalese plain, the Rotaldo River follows a sinuous course, passing through Borgo San Martino, Ticineto, and Valmacca where it is joined from the left by the Gattola. It enters the Po River at Bozzole.
