= Versa (Tanaro) =

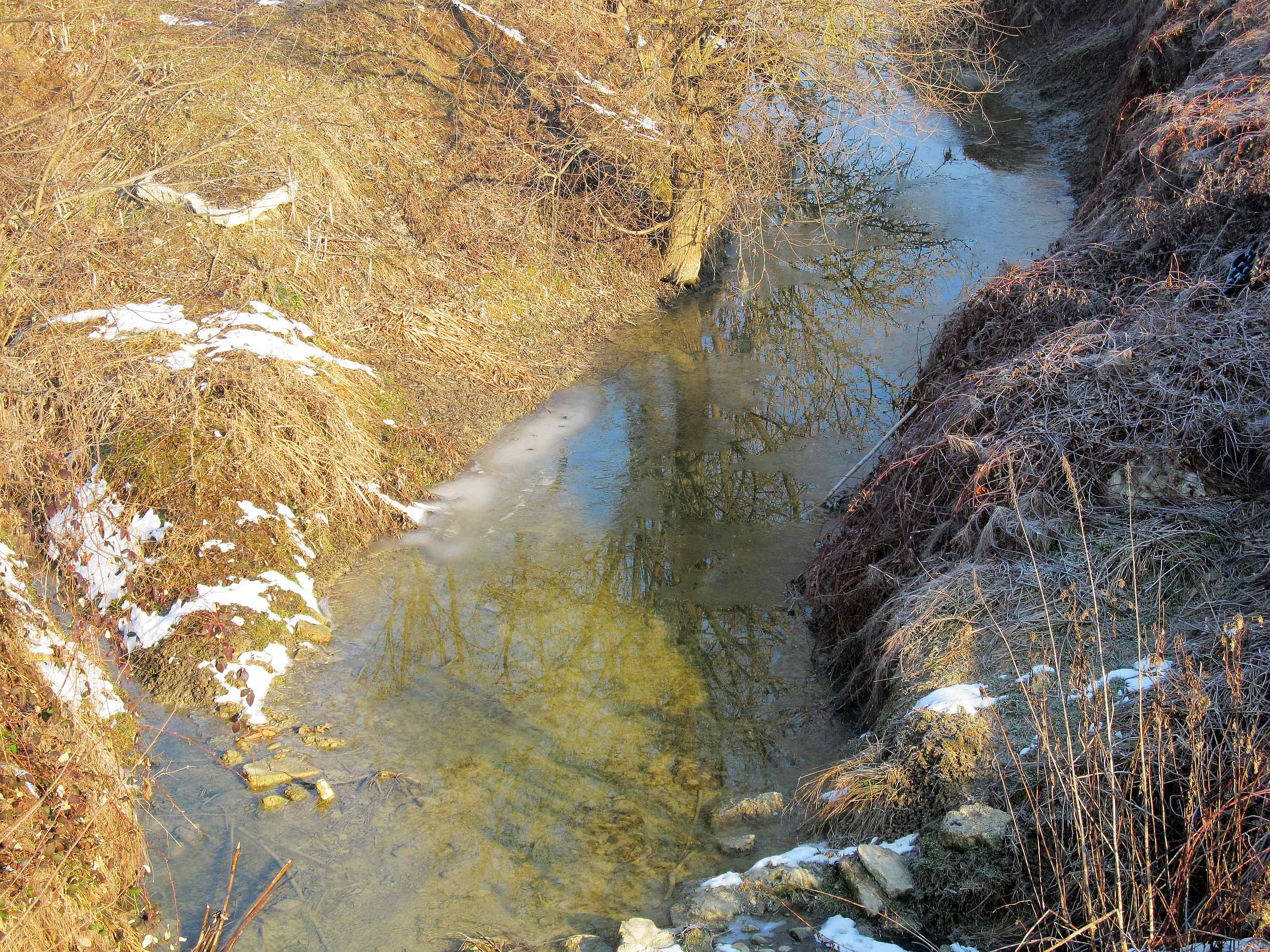
- The stream in Montiglio, near its source.

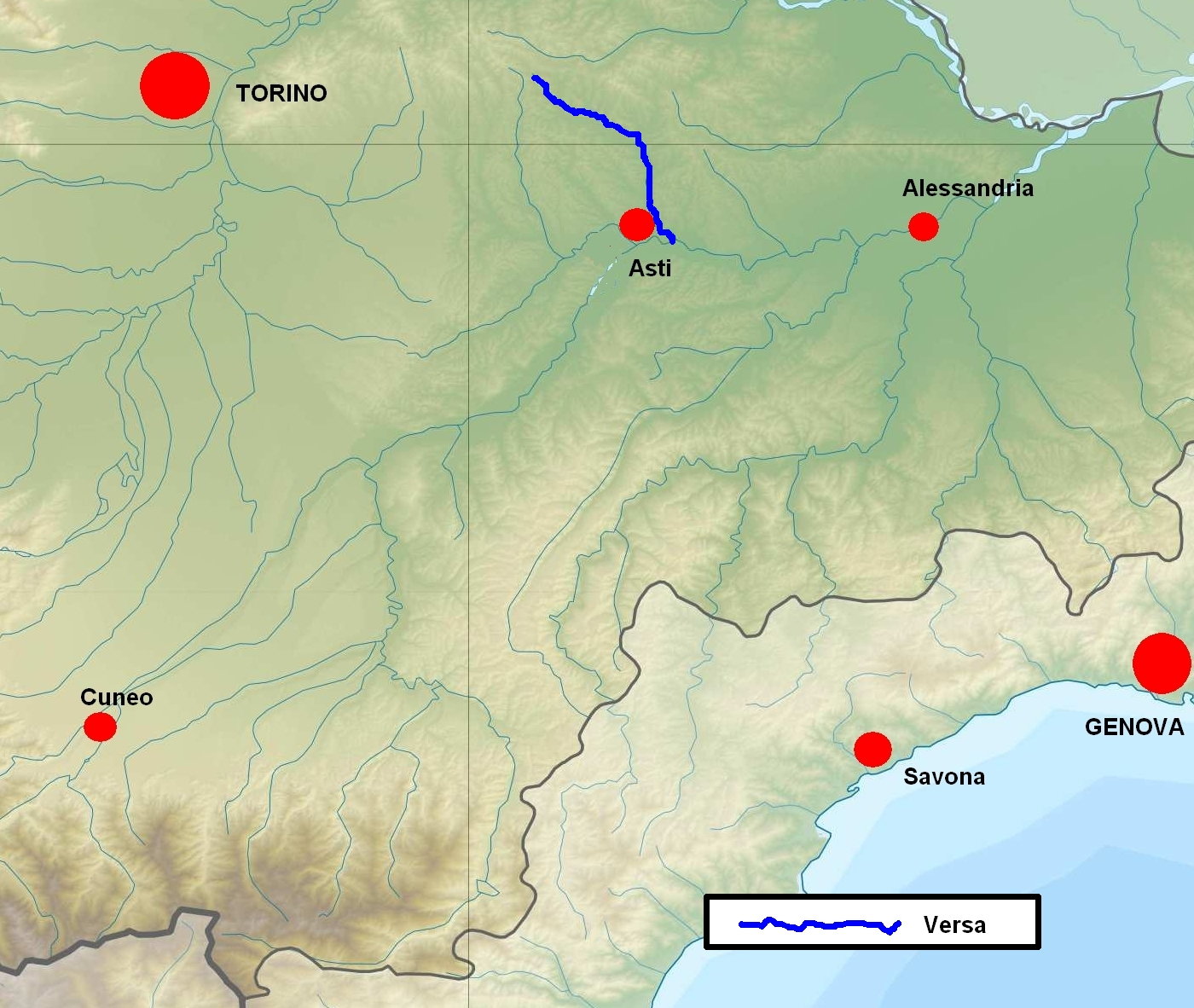
- Location of the stream within southern Piedmont

Location
- Country: Italy

Physical characteristics
- Source
  - location: close to Cocconato
- Mouth: Tanaro
  - coordinates: 44°53′19″N 8°16′10″E
- Length: 38.6 km (24.0 mi)
- Basin size: 200.4 km^{2} (77.4 mi^{2})
- Discharge
  - average: 3.5 m^{3}/s (120 cu ft/s)

Basin features
- Progression: Tanaro→ Po→ Adriatic Sea

The Versa, a left tributary of the Tanaro, is a 35-kilometre (22 mi) torrent in the Province of Asti in north-west Italy. It is the river of the valley called Valle Versa. In 1836 the Versa was identified, along with the Rotaldo, the Grana, the Stura and the Gattola, as one of the five torrents of the still extant Province of Casale.

Its source is a little to the north of Cocconato near the border with the Province of Turin. After a generally southerly course of 35 kilometres it enters the Tanaro just to the east of Asti.

This river is not to be confused with the Versa that is a tributary of the Po.
