= Gattola =

Location
- Country: Italy

Physical characteristics
- Mouth: Rotaldo
  - coordinates: 45.1092°N 8.5367°E

Basin features
- Progression: Rotaldo→ Po→ Adriatic Sea

The Gattola is a stream of the Basso Monferrato in north-west Italy, a left tributary of the Rotaldo. In 1836 it was of sufficient importance to be listed in the Dizionario geografico, storico, statistico, commerciale degli stati di S.M. il re di Sardegna as one of the five principal torrents of the still-extant Province of Casale; the others – significantly more substantial water courses – were the Rotaldo, the Grana, the Stura and the Versa.

From its sources in the region of Ozzano Monferrato it passes through San Giorgio Monferrato and Casale Monferrato before joining the Rotaldo near Ticineto. Shortly afterwards the Rotaldo itself enters the Po near Bozzole.
