= Valmacca =

- Comune
- Comune di Valmacca
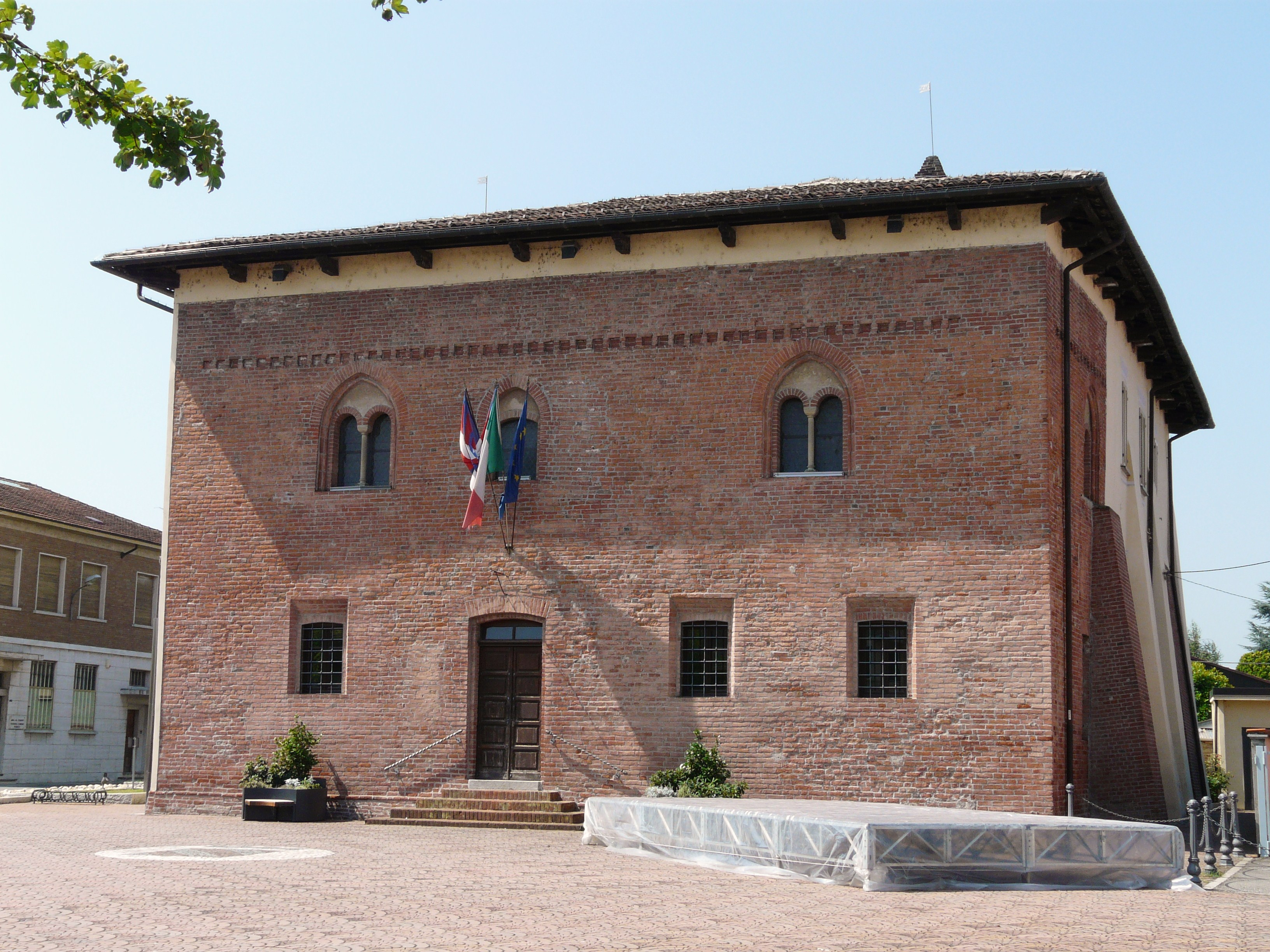
- Town hall.

- Location within Italy Location within Piedmont
- Coordinates: 45°6′N 8°35′E
- Country: Italy
- Region: Piedmont
- Province: Alessandria (AL)

Government
  - Mayor: Gianni Boselli

Area
  - Total: 12.6 km^{2} (4.9 sq mi)
- Elevation: 97 m (318 ft)

Population (31 December 2013)
  - Total: 1,040
  - Density: 82.5/km^{2} (214/sq mi)
- Demonym: Valmacchesi
- Time zone: UTC+1 (CET)
  - Summer (DST): UTC+2 (CEST)
- Postal code: 15040
- Dialing code: 0142
- Website: Official website

Valmacca is a comune (municipality) in the Province of Alessandria in the Italian region Piedmont, located about 70 kilometres (43 mi) east of Turin and about 20 kilometres (12 mi) north of Alessandria in an area of plain on the right of the Po River at the confluence of the Rotaldo and the Gattola.

Valmacca borders the following municipalities: Bozzole, Breme, Frassineto Po, Pomaro Monferrato, Sartirana Lomellina, and Ticineto.
