= Sartirana =

Sartirana may refer to:

- Sartirana Lomellina, a village and commune in the Italian province of Pavia
- A locality within the municipal boundaries of Merate, a town in Italian province of Lecco
- Lago di Sartirana, a lake near Merate
