= Versa =

Versa or VERSA may refer to:

== Geography ==
- Versa (Po), a tributary of the Po that runs through Pavia, Italy
- Versa (Tanaro), a tributary of the Tanaro that runs through Asti, Italy
- Versa (Torre), a tributary of the Torre

== Transportation ==
- Maruti Versa, a small van
- Mitsubishi Versa Van, a rebadged Nissan Urvan sold in the Philippines
- Nissan Versa, a subcompact car
- Optare Versa, a British-built midibus

== Other uses ==
- Fitbit Versa
- Versa (band) or VersaEmerge, an experimental rock band
- NEC Versa, brand of laptops manufactured by NEC

== See also ==
- Vancomycin-resistant Staphylococcus aureus or VRSA
- Vice Versa (disambiguation)
