= Sannazzaro =

Sannazzaro or Sannazaro may refer to:

- Castello Sannazzaro di Giarole
- Sannazzaro de' Burgondi

== People with the surname ==
- Ludovica Sannazzaro, Italian internet personality
- Jacopo Sannazaro, Italian poet
