= Conzano =

- Comune
- Comune di Conzano
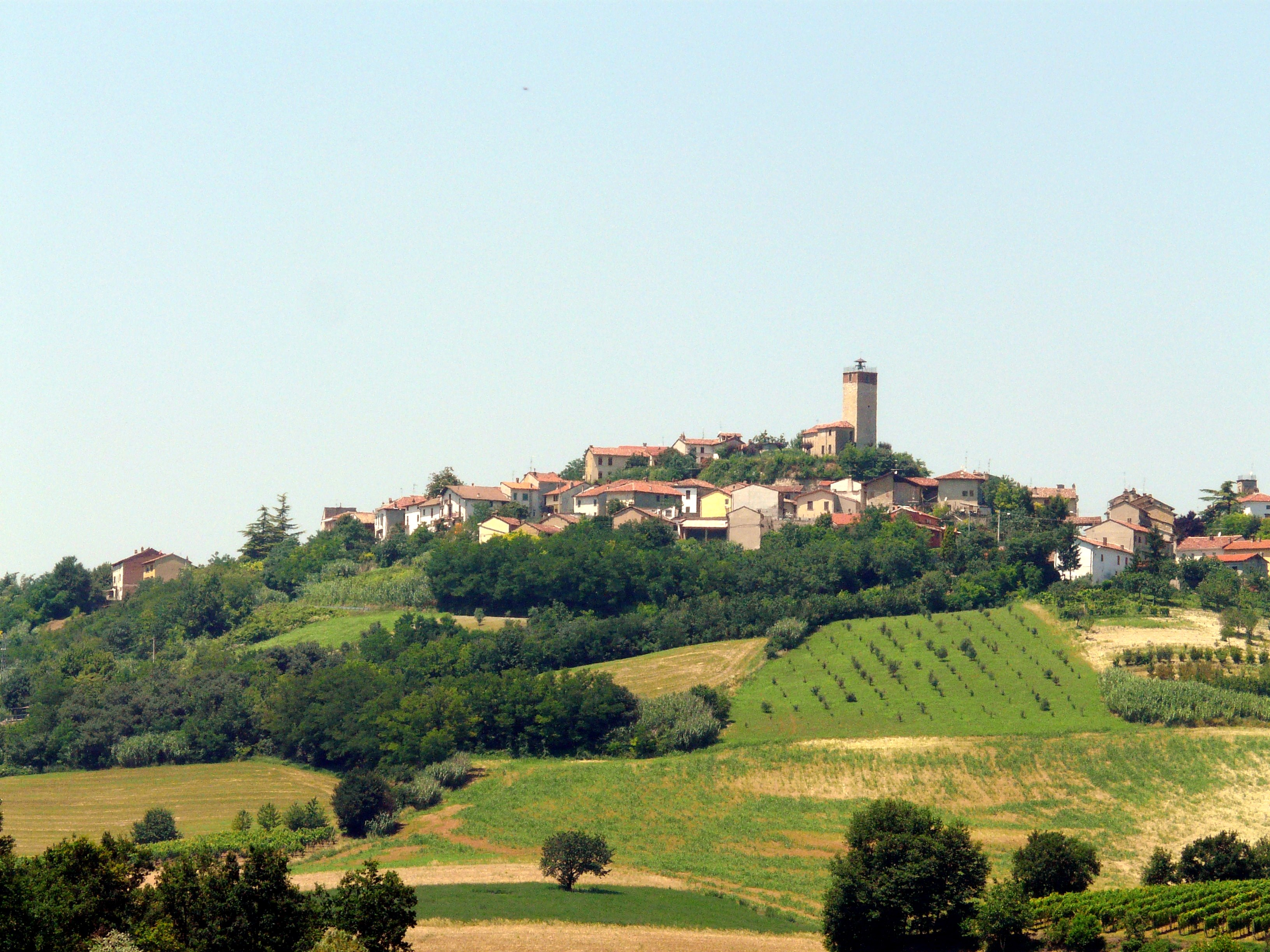

- Location within Italy Location within Piedmont
- Coordinates: 45°1′17″N 8°27′18″E
- Country: Italy
- Region: Piedmont
- Province: Alessandria (AL)
- Frazioni: San Maurizio

Government
  - Mayor: Emanuele Demaria

Area
  - Total: 11.61 km^{2} (4.48 sq mi)
- Elevation: 262 m (860 ft)

Population (30 June 2017)
  - Total: 958
  - Density: 82.5/km^{2} (214/sq mi)
- Demonym: Conzanesi
- Time zone: UTC+1 (CET)
  - Summer (DST): UTC+2 (CEST)
- Postal code: 15030
- Dialing code: 0142
- Patron saint: Saint Lucy of Syracuse
- Saint day: 13 December
- Website: Official website

The Commune of Conzano (Italian: Comune di Conzano; Piemontese: Consan) is a municipality located in the south of Casale Monferrato, in the north-west of the italian province of Alessandria.
The town became famous for having been declared, in 1992, as the symbol of the massive emigration of the people to the northern Queensland, Australia, about 1890-1935 period: the ancient town square, named Piazza d'Armi (= Weapons Square), was renamed in Piazza Australia and Conzano has been twinned with Ingham, Queensland.

== Geography ==
The town is situated on the Montferrat hills, among the Grana and Rotaldo creeks, at an altitude of 262 meters above the sea level, and includes two decentralized hamlets (the latter's formal status as a frazione) in the northern flat side (near Casale Monferrato), recognised in the Statuto Comunale): the first one is Castello, the second one is San Maurizio. To the north-east side, the country borders with Occimiano, to the south-east with Lu e Cuccaro Monferrato, and to the west with Camagna Monferrato. The municipal territory extends over a predominantly rural area of 11.62 square kilometres (4.49 mi^{2}).

== Ancient history ==
In ancient times, the site was inhabited by prehistoric settlements, followed by a Roman colonization of consul Marco Fulvio Flacco (2nd century), contemporary of Celtic-ligurian tribes named Iadatine, from the Latin Iactum, the ancient name of the Grana creek.
Since 3rd century A.D. they are documented rules of patrician praedials named Medialianus, but also Condius, Contius, accordingly the origin of toponym Contiacus, Conziacanus, Conzianus. A true urban village begins about the 5th century, at the bottom of the hill. Exposed to repeated incursions throughout the Middle Ages, especially the Lombards, Goths and Saracens, old village was totally destroyed, and the new village was built in the 10th century on the top of the hill, with a topographical structure in concentric circles, on ancient places named Pozzo Piazza and bric (= peak) Saint Lucia (= Saint Lucy of Syracuse).
The Emperor Otto I of Saxony gave the village in manor to the Lords of Cuccaro; in the same period, Marquis Oberto gift to the Cluniac congregation property for the construction of a little Benedictine Priory, and the decentralized San Maurizio hamlet began to be populated.

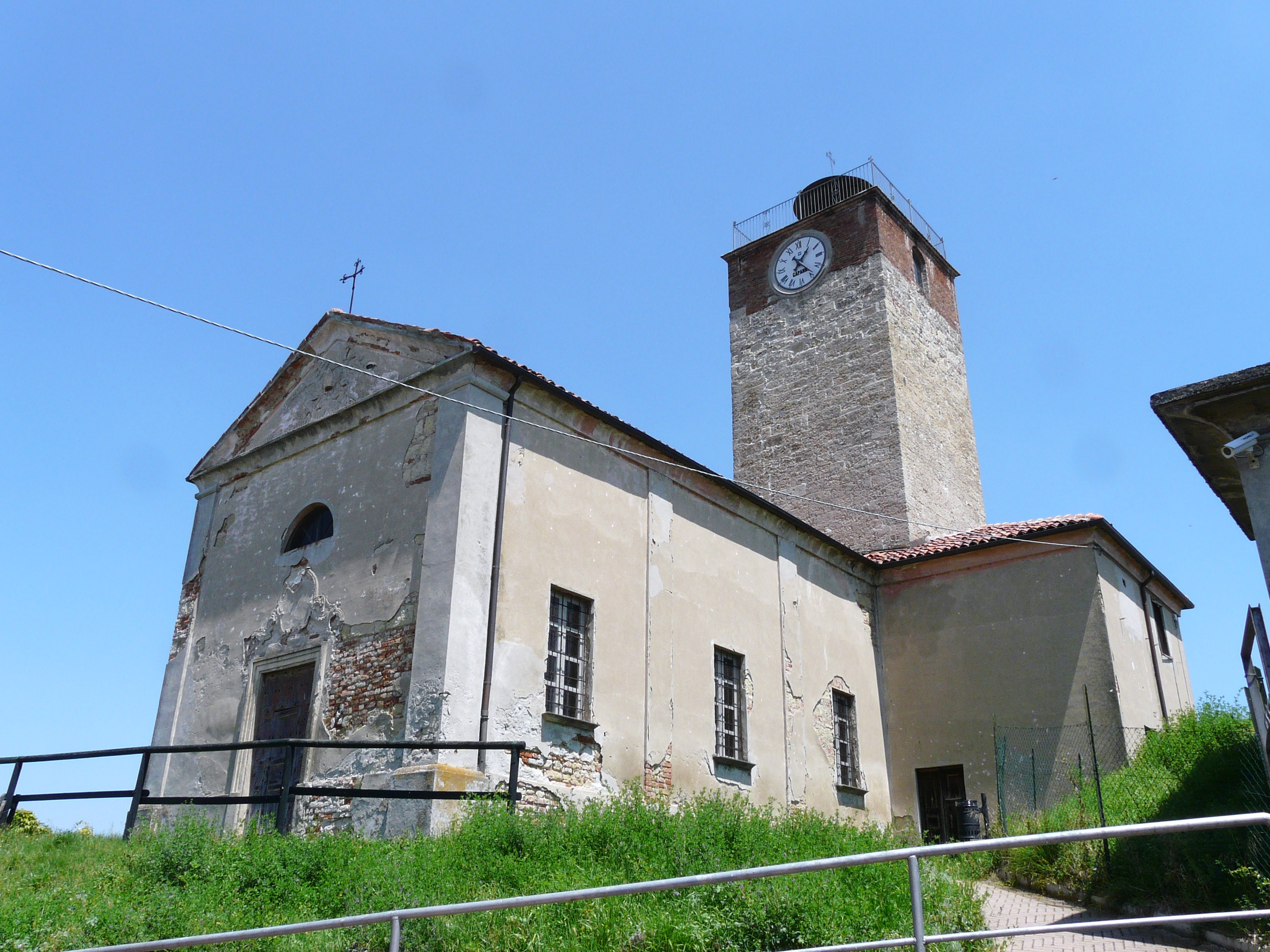
Clock tower & San Biagio

Since 12th century, Conzano was dominated by the March of Montferrat, in quarrel with the Ghilini dynasty, Lords of Alessandria. Accordingly, the town was fortified, with the construction of a tower on the eastern side, called today the "Clock Tower" or "Civic Tower". About 15th century, in front of it, is built the pretty little church of San Biagio. Slightly late, is the small church of the decentralized hamlet of San Maurizio, in late Gothic style (about half of the 15th century), where it seems to be here the remains of queen Sophia, daughter of Theodore II, Marquess of Montferrat and 2nd wife of emperor John VIII Palaiologos. On the same road, it was built a small castle (nonexistent today, replaced by a recent private villa), who gave built to the current namesake hamlet. In the 16th century, the country came under the territory of the dukes Gonzaga, until the 18th century, when they were deposed.

== Early modern period ==
Since 1709, Conzano was annexed to the Duchy of Savoy, under direct control of the Casale Monferrato district before, the Marengo department during the Napoleonic occupation. The ruins of ancient medieval structure of the village castle was remodeled in the Franciscan convent building, now at the end of the 18th century, rebuilt to house destined to a rich Count named Carlo Vidua ; The villa, which is open to the public, is particularly known for its interior decorations in the Chinese manner.
The population increased, at least until the call of the second italian war of independence (1859) and, after, the World War I. In addition, the Great Depression economic downfall in the late 9th century impoverished small rural towns. People spared the last money to travel to distant lands, for example to America, but especially to Australia. Many farmers moved from Montferrat, Italy, to the Northern Queensland, Australia, where there was a strong job demand about cutting sugar canes, a work very similar to a farming job. The poorest towns of the area were Lu, Occimiano, Cuccaro and, above all, Conzano, why there was a massive emigration, especially from this place.

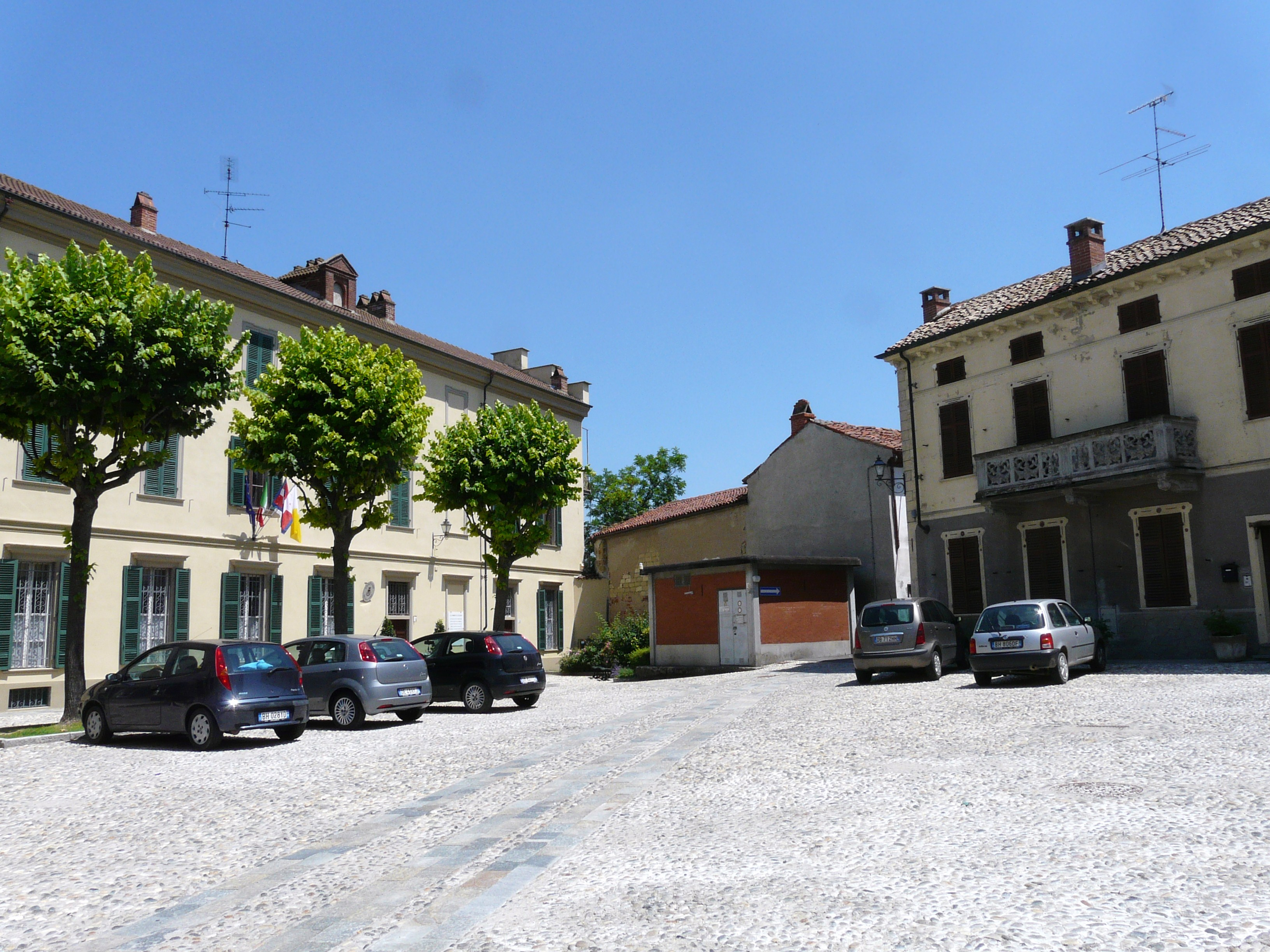
Australia square

In 1992, there was a discovery of this interesting historical events, the town has been twinned with Ingham, Queensland, the opening of a thematic exhibition and a quote in memory of the official spokesman of conzanese people emigrated to Australia, Ettore Cantamessa (1892-1947).

== Twin town ==
- (Australia) Ingham, a town with some 4,700 inhabitants in the Australian state of Queensland, has been twinned with Conzano since 1992-1993.

== Population trends ==
Historical population

Year	Pop.	±%
1861	1,394	—
1871	1,670	+19.8%
1881	1,838	+10.1%
1901	2,134	+16.1%
1911	2,224	+4.2%

Year	Pop.	±%
1921	1,738	−21.9%
1931	1,458	−16.1%
1936	1,460	+0.1%
1951	1,232	−15.6%
1961	1,029	−16.5%

Year	Pop.	±%
1971	829	−19.4%
1981	793	−4.3%
1991	868	+9.5%
2001	1,005	+15.8%

Source: Data from ISTAT
