= Torre Beretti e Castellaro =

- Comune
- Comune di Torre Beretti e Castellaro
- Location within Italy Location within Lombardy
- Coordinates: 45°4′N 8°40′E
- Country: Italy
- Region: Lombardy
- Province: Province of Pavia (PV)

Area
  - Total: 17.5 km^{2} (6.8 sq mi)
- Elevation: 89 m (292 ft)

Population (Dec. 2004)
  - Total: 604
  - Density: 34.5/km^{2} (89.4/sq mi)
- Demonym: Torreberettesi
- Time zone: UTC+1 (CET)
  - Summer (DST): UTC+2 (CEST)
- Postal code: 27030
- Dialing code: 0384

Torre Beretti e Castellaro is a comune (municipality) in the Province of Pavia in the Italian region Lombardy, located about 60 km (37 mi) southwest of Milan and about 40 km (25 mi) southwest of Pavia. As of 31 December 2004, it had a population of 604 and an area of 17.5 km^{2} (6.8 sq mi).

Torre Beretti e Castellaro borders the following municipalities: Bozzole, Frascarolo, Mede, Sartirana Lomellina, Valenza.

== Demographic evolution ==
Historical population

Year	Pop.	±%
1861	1,528	—
1871	1,631	+6.7%
1881	1,532	−6.1%
1901	1,466	−4.3%
1911	1,393	−5.0%

Year	Pop.	±%
1921	1,189	−14.6%
1931	1,095	−7.9%
1936	1,117	+2.0%
1951	1,137	+1.8%
1961	1,023	−10.0%

Year	Pop.	±%
1971	758	−25.9%
1981	675	−10.9%
1991	649	−3.9%
2001	558	−14.0%

Source: Data from ISTAT
