= Giarole =

- Comune
- Comune di Giarole
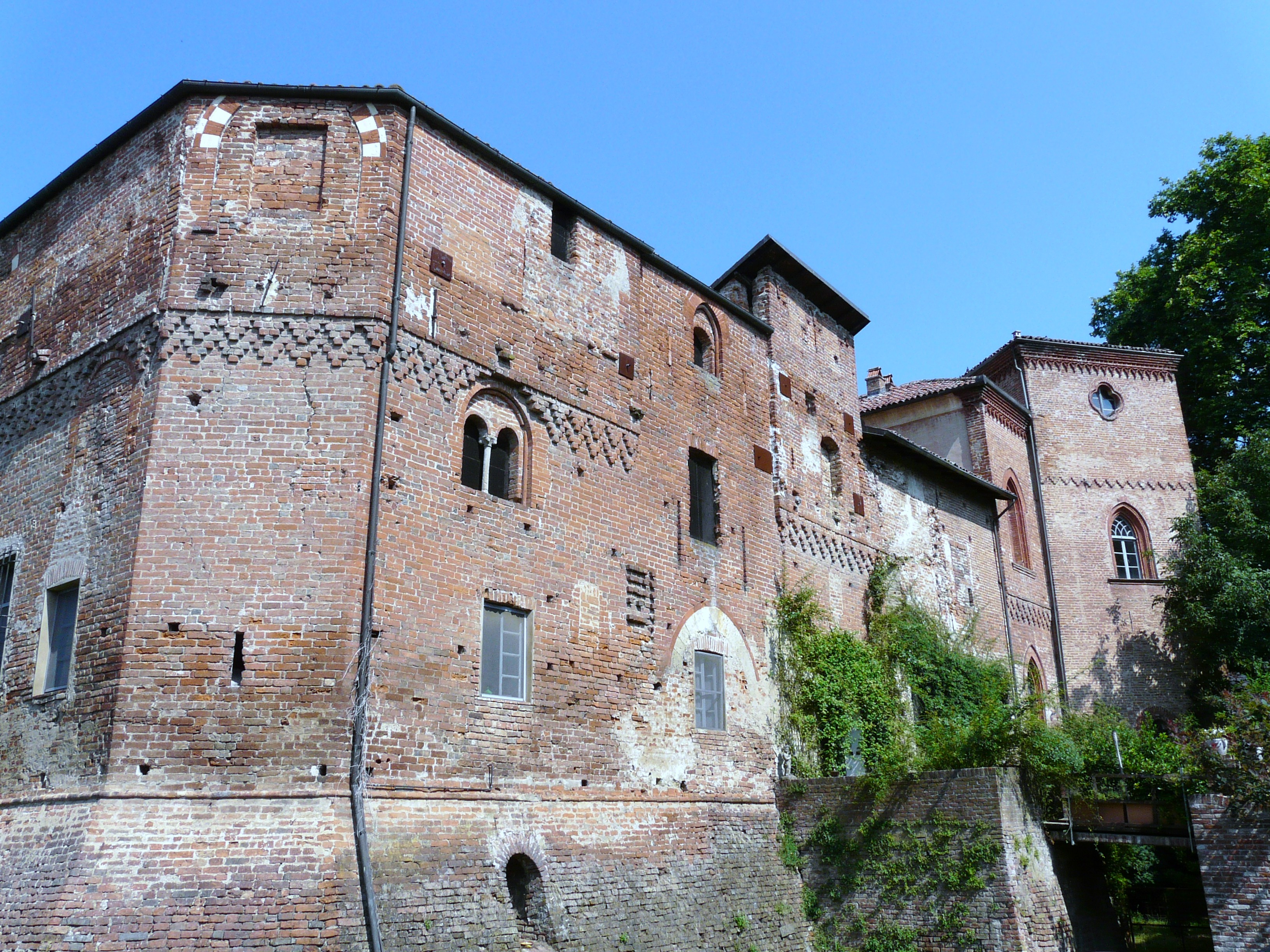
- The Castello Sannazzaro di Giarole

- Location within Italy Location within Piedmont
- Coordinates: 45°4′N 8°34′E
- Country: Italy
- Region: Piedmont
- Province: Province of Alessandria (AL)

Area
  - Total: 5.2 km^{2} (2.0 sq mi)

Population (Dec. 2004)
  - Total: 693
  - Density: 130/km^{2} (350/sq mi)
- Time zone: UTC+1 (CET)
  - Summer (DST): UTC+2 (CEST)
- Postal code: 15036
- Dialing code: 0142

Giarole is a comune (municipality) in the Province of Alessandria in the Italian region Piedmont, located about 70 kilometres (43 mi) east of Turin and about 15 kilometres (9 mi) north of Alessandria. As of 31 December 2004, it had a population of 693 and an area of 5.2 square kilometres (2.0 mi^{2}).

Giarole borders the following municipalities: Mirabello Monferrato, Occimiano, Pomaro Monferrato, and Valenza.

As historical place it is notable the Castle of Sannazzaro, built in the 12th century.

== Demographic evolution ==
Historical population

Year	Pop.	±%
1861	1,019	—
1871	1,020	+0.1%
1881	1,100	+7.8%
1901	1,126	+2.4%
1911	1,109	−1.5%

Year	Pop.	±%
1921	1,027	−7.4%
1931	922	−10.2%
1936	848	−8.0%
1951	838	−1.2%
1961	835	−0.4%

Year	Pop.	±%
1971	784	−6.1%
1981	731	−6.8%
1991	723	−1.1%
2001	690	−4.6%

Source: Data from ISTAT

== Notable people ==
- Ludovica Sannazzaro, internet personality
