= Frassineto =

Frassineto may refer to:

- Frassineto Po, comune in the Province of Alessandria in the Italian region Piedmont
- Frassineto, site of Muslim fortress in Provence
- Frassineto, hamlet of Arezzo
