= Breme =

Breme Bräm (Lombard)
- Comune
- Comune di Breme
- Location within Italy Location within Lombardy
- Coordinates: 45°8′N 8°38′E
- Country: Italy
- Region: Lombardy
- Province: Province of Pavia (PV)

Area
  - Total: 19.2 km^{2} (7.4 sq mi)
- Elevation: 101 m (331 ft)

Population (Dec. 2004)
  - Total: 889
  - Density: 46.3/km^{2} (120/sq mi)
- Demonym: Bremesi
- Time zone: UTC+1 (CET)
  - Summer (DST): UTC+2 (CEST)
- Postal code: 27020
- Dialing code: 0384
- Website: Official website

Breme (Lombard: Bräm) is a comune (municipality) in the Province of Pavia in the Italian region of Lombardy, located about 60 kilometres (37 mi) southwest of Milan and about 40 kilometres (25 mi) west of Pavia. As of 31 December 2004, it had a population of 889 and an area of 19.2 square kilometres (7.4 mi^{2}).

Breme borders the following municipalities: Candia Lomellina, Frassineto Po, Sartirana Lomellina, Valle Lomellina, Valmacca.

== Demographic evolution ==
Historical population

Year	Pop.	±%
1861	2,320	—
1871	2,561	+10.4%
1881	2,911	+13.7%
1901	2,947	+1.2%
1911	2,831	−3.9%

Year	Pop.	±%
1921	2,485	−12.2%
1931	2,266	−8.8%
1936	2,210	−2.5%
1951	2,052	−7.1%
1961	1,847	−10.0%

Year	Pop.	±%
1971	1,423	−23.0%
1981	1,184	−16.8%
1991	1,002	−15.4%
2001	936	−6.6%

Source: Data from ISTAT
