= Pomaro Monferrato =

- Comune
- Comune di Pomaro Monferrato
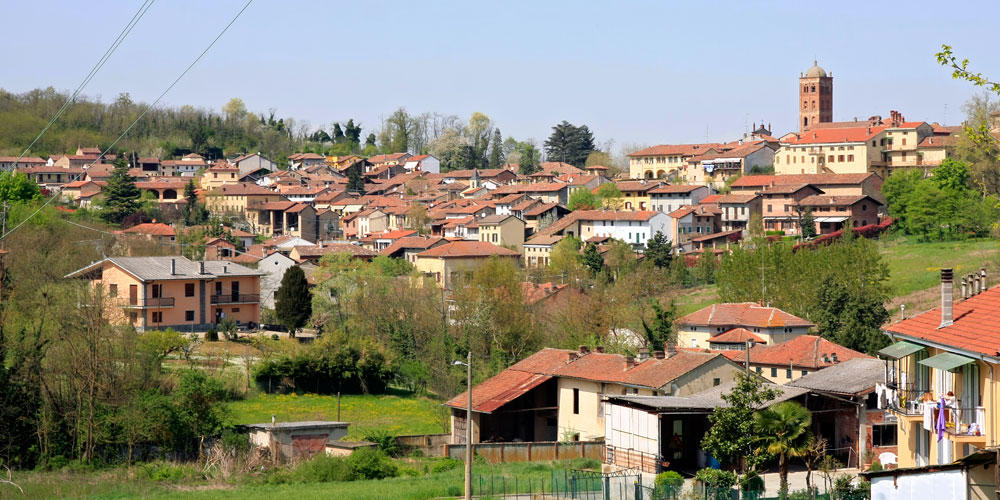

- Location within Italy Location within Piedmont
- Coordinates: 45°3′48″N 8°35′50″E
- Country: Italy
- Region: Piedmont
- Province: Alessandria (AL)

Government
  - Mayor: Mirco Amisano

Area
  - Total: 13.56 km^{2} (5.24 sq mi)
- Elevation: 142 m (466 ft)

Population (31 December 2010)
  - Total: 386
  - Density: 28.5/km^{2} (73.7/sq mi)
- Demonym: Pomaresi
- Time zone: UTC+1 (CET)
  - Summer (DST): UTC+2 (CEST)
- Postal code: 15040
- Dialing code: 0142
- Saint day: 29 August
- Website: Official website

Pomaro Monferrato is a comune (municipality) in the Province of Alessandria in the Italian region Piedmont, located about 70 kilometres (43 mi) east of Turin and about 15 kilometres (9 mi) north of Alessandria.

Pomaro Monferrato borders the following municipalities: Borgo San Martino, Bozzole, Giarole, Occimiano, Ticineto, Valenza, and Valmacca.

== Main sights ==
- Castle, now a private patrician residence
- Palazzo del Corpo di Guardia (13th-14th centuries)
- Parish church of Santa Sabina, in Gothic-Romanesque style
