= Sartirana Lomellina =

- Comune
- Comune di Sartirana Lomellina
- Location within Italy Location within Lombardy
- Coordinates: 45°6′N 8°39′E
- Country: Italy
- Region: Lombardy
- Province: Province of Pavia (PV)

Area
  - Total: 29.5 km^{2} (11.4 sq mi)
- Elevation: 100 m (330 ft)

Population (Dec. 2004)
  - Total: 1,837
  - Density: 62.3/km^{2} (161/sq mi)
- Demonym: Sartiranesi
- Time zone: UTC+1 (CET)
  - Summer (DST): UTC+2 (CEST)
- Postal code: 27020
- Dialing code: 0384

Sartirana Lomellina is a comune (municipality) in the Province of Pavia in the Italian region Lombardy, located about 60 km southwest of Milan and about 40 km west of Pavia. As of 31 December 2004, it had a population of 1,837 and an area of 29.5 km^{2}.

Sartirana Lomellina borders the following municipalities: Bozzole, Breme, Mede, Semiana, Torre Beretti e Castellaro, Valle Lomellina, Valmacca.

== Demographic evolution ==
Historical population

Year	Pop.	±%
1861	3,673	—
1871	4,055	+10.4%
1881	4,374	+7.9%
1901	4,287	−2.0%
1911	4,304	+0.4%

Year	Pop.	±%
1921	3,913	−9.1%
1931	3,390	−13.4%
1936	3,253	−4.0%
1951	3,257	+0.1%
1961	2,960	−9.1%

Year	Pop.	±%
1971	2,353	−20.5%
1981	2,092	−11.1%
1991	1,938	−7.4%
2001	1,900	−2.0%

Source: Data from ISTAT

== Twin towns ==
Sartirana Lomellina is twinned with:

- Blainville-sur-Orne, France, since 2007
