= Bozzole =

- Comune
- Comune di Bozzole
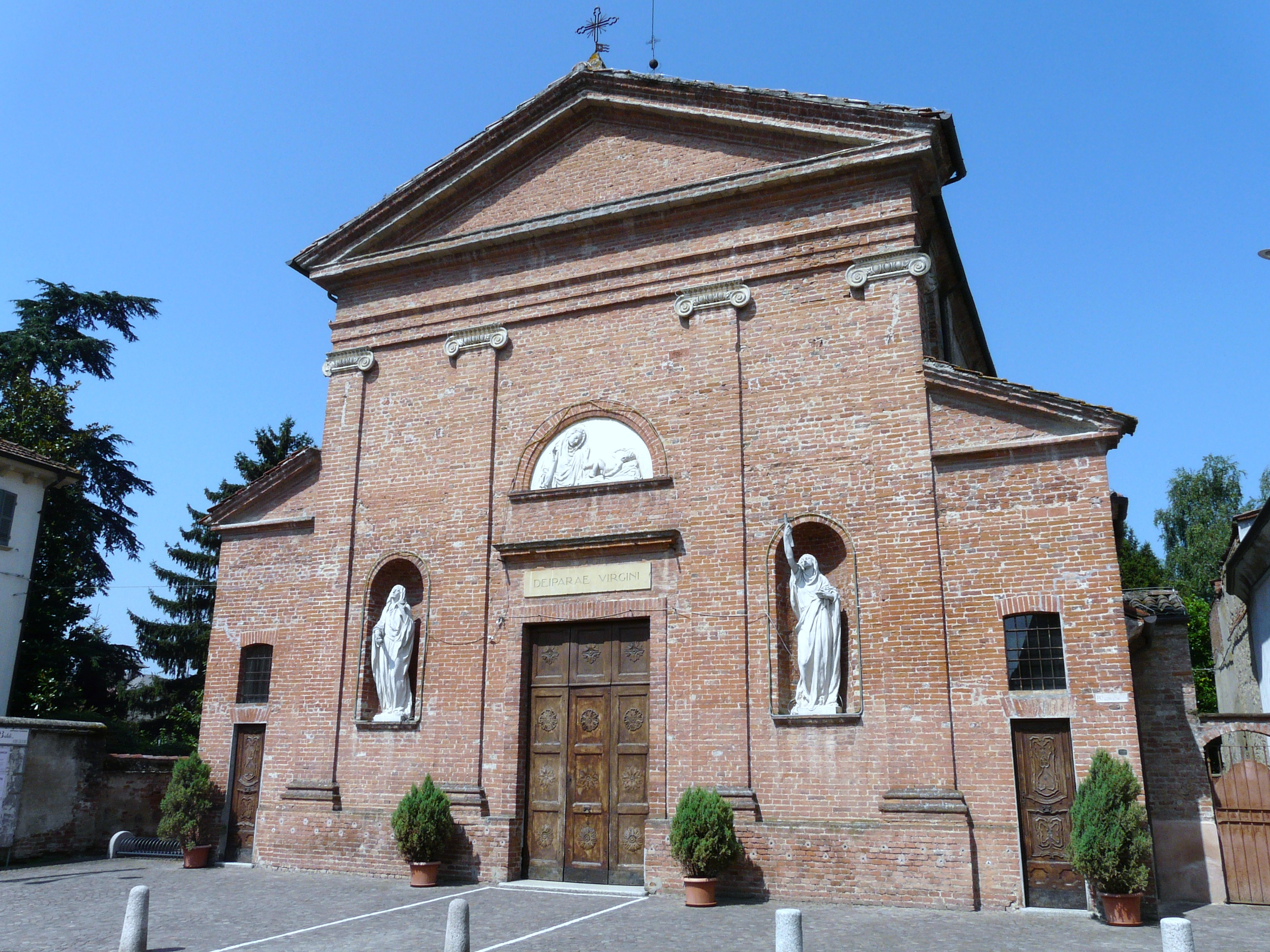

- Location within Italy Location within Piedmont
- Coordinates: 45°4′N 8°36′E
- Country: Italy
- Region: Piedmont
- Province: Province of Alessandria (AL)

Area
  - Total: 9.4 km^{2} (3.6 sq mi)

Population (Dec. 2004)
  - Total: 311
  - Density: 33/km^{2} (86/sq mi)
- Time zone: UTC+1 (CET)
  - Summer (DST): UTC+2 (CEST)
- Postal code: 15040
- Dialing code: 0142

Bozzole is a comune (municipality) in the Province of Alessandria in the Italian region Piedmont, located about 70 kilometres (43 mi) east of Turin and about 15 kilometres (9 mi) north of Alessandria. As of 31 December 2004, it had a population of 311 and an area of 9.4 square kilometres (3.6 mi^{2}).

Bozzole borders the following municipalities: Pomaro Monferrato, Sartirana Lomellina, Torre Beretti e Castellaro, Valenza, and Valmacca.

== Demographic evolution ==
Historical population

Year	Pop.	±%
1861	796	—
1871	735	−7.7%
1881	718	−2.3%
1901	817	+13.8%
1911	726	−11.1%

Year	Pop.	±%
1921	608	−16.3%
1931	574	−5.6%
1936	561	−2.3%
1951	583	+3.9%
1961	499	−14.4%

Year	Pop.	±%
1971	415	−16.8%
1981	358	−13.7%
1991	329	−8.1%
2001	293	−10.9%

Source: Data from ISTAT
