= Lago di Sartirana =

Lake in Lombardy, Italy

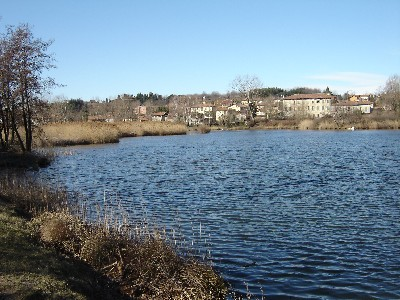

- Location within Lombardy
- Location: Province of Lecco, Lombardy
- Coordinates: 45°42′58″N 9°25′29″E
- Basin countries: Italy
- Surface area: 0.098 km^{2} (0.038 sq mi)

Lago di Sartirana is a small lake in the Province of Lecco, Lombardy, Italy. Its surface area is 0.098 km^{2}. while the surrounding protected area extends to about 23.6 hectares. It is of moraine origin, formed by glacial deposits.
