= Occimiano =

- Comune
- Comune di Occimiano
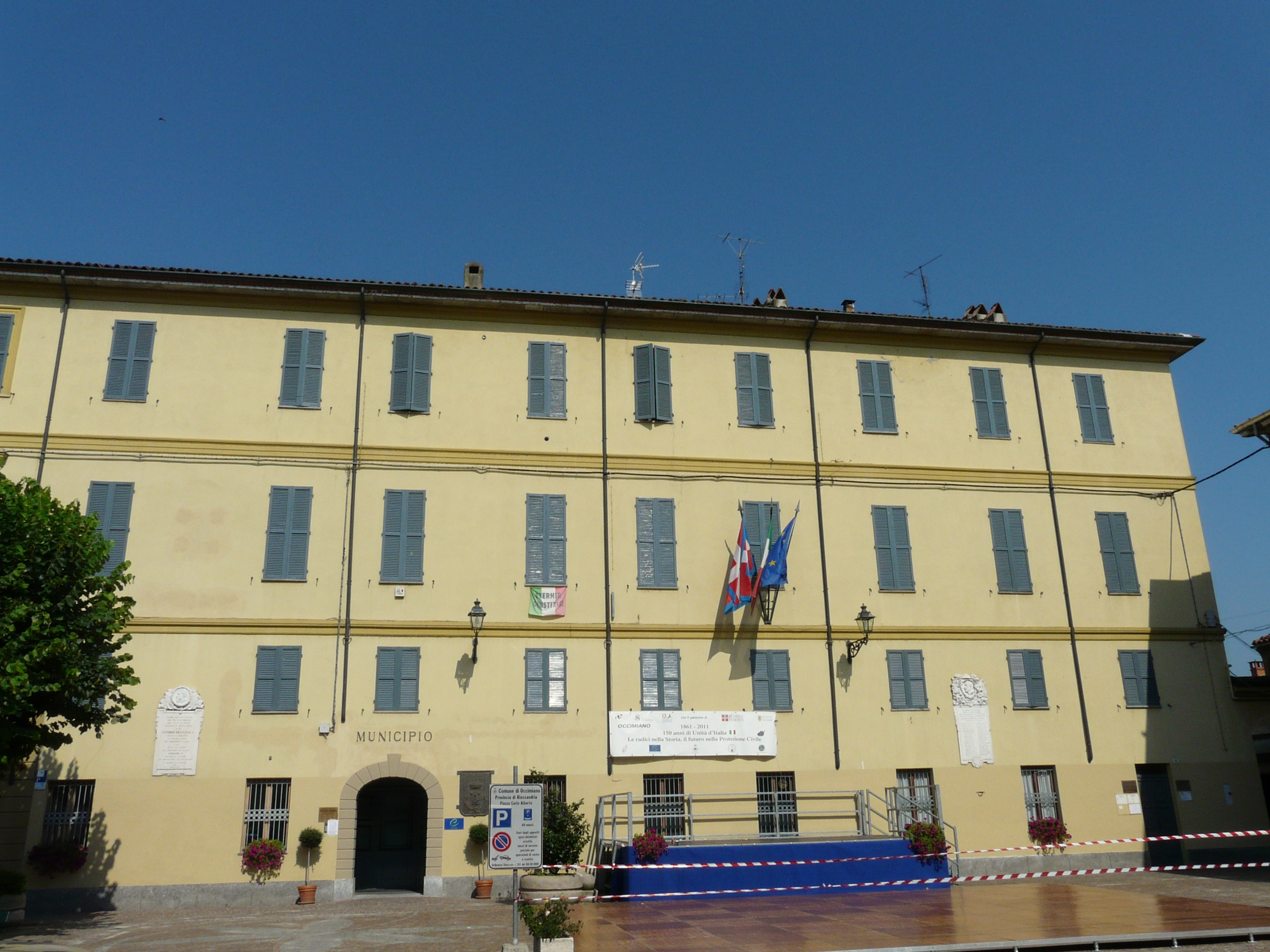

- Location within Italy Location within Piedmont
- Coordinates: 45°4′N 8°30′E
- Country: Italy
- Region: Piedmont
- Province: Alessandria (AL)

Government
  - Mayor: Valeria Olivieri

Area
  - Total: 22.46 km^{2} (8.67 sq mi)
- Elevation: 107 m (351 ft)

Population (30 November 2019)
  - Total: 1,256
  - Density: 55.92/km^{2} (144.8/sq mi)
- Demonym: Occimianesi
- Time zone: UTC+1 (CET)
  - Summer (DST): UTC+2 (CEST)
- Postal code: 15040
- Dialing code: 0142
- Website: Official website

Occimiano is a comune (municipality) in the Province of Alessandria in the Italian region Piedmont, located about 60 kilometres (37 mi) east of Turin and about 20 kilometres (12 mi) northwest of Alessandria.

Occimiano borders the following municipalities: Borgo San Martino, Casale Monferrato, Conzano, Giarole, Lu e Cuccaro Monferrato, Mirabello Monferrato, and Pomaro Monferrato.
