= Castello Sannazzaro di Giarole =

Castle in Giarole, Italy

Castello Sannazzaro
- Castello di Sannazzaro di Giarole (Italian)
- Sannazzaro Castle
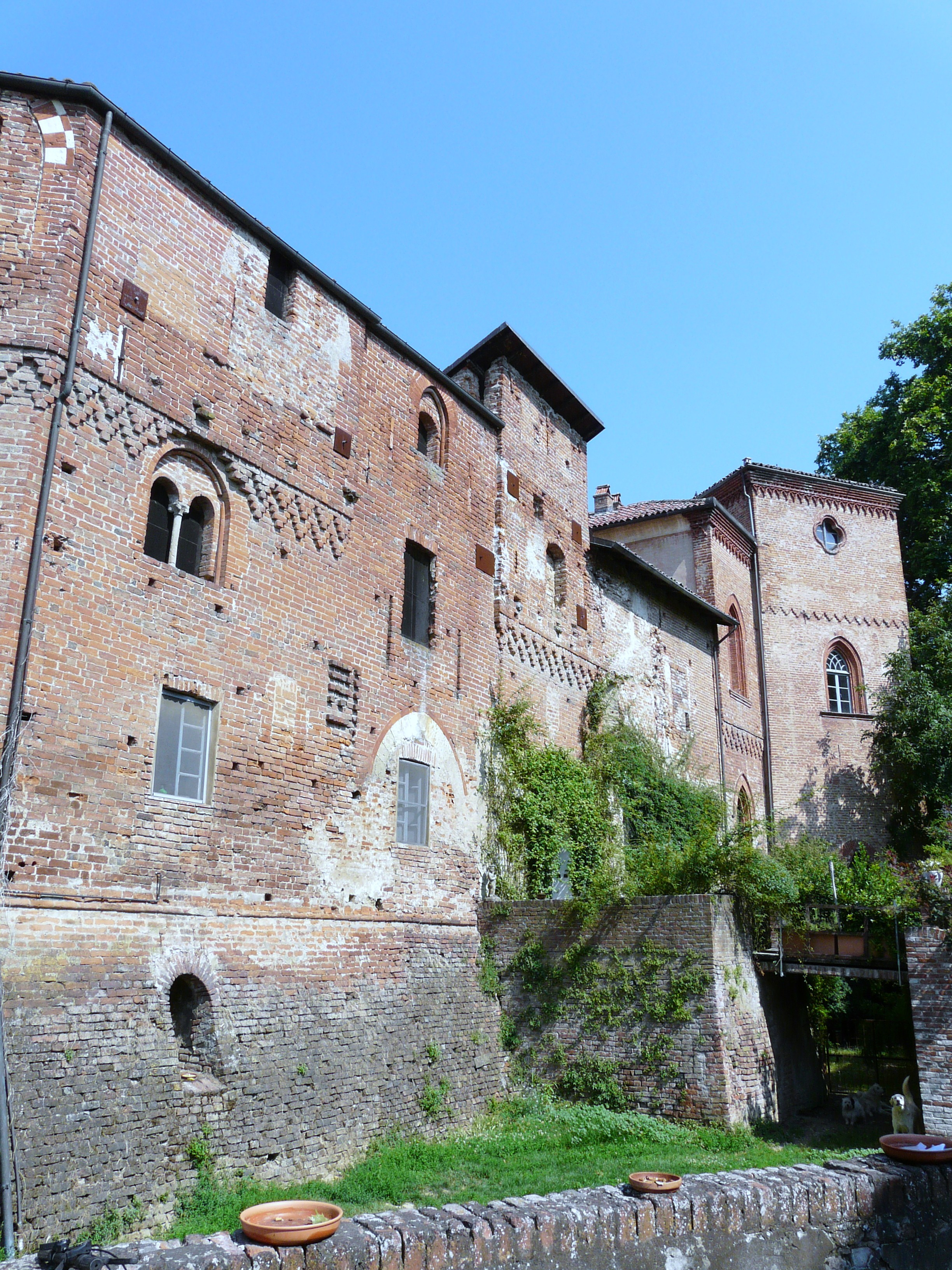
- The castle in 2011

- Location within Italy
- 45°3′41.88″N 8°33′56.54″E
- Location: Giarole, Alessandria, Piedmont, Italy

History
- Built: 1780

Site notes
- Owner: Sannazzaro family
- Website: castellosannazzaro.it

The Castello Sannazzaro di Giarole is a castle in Giarole. The Sannazzaro family built the castle after receiving special privileges from Frederick I in 1163. In the twenty-first century, the Castello Sannazzaro remains in the Sannazzaro family and is run as a bed and breakfast.

== History ==
The Sannazzaro family, an Italian noble family originally from Lomellina, were granted the privileges to build the castle by Holy Roman Emperor Frederick I in 1163. The emperor gave an imperial decree to four knights, Guido, Burgundio, Assalito, and Raineri de Santo Nazario, which permitted them to build castles on their lands. The castle is located in Giarole, a small village in the Piedmont region. It was built between the 12th and 14th centuries. The original structure was modified multiple times in the 18th century. In the 1850s, restoration took place on the north and west wings of the castle which added Neo-Gothic style, which was fashionable at that time. Castello Sannazzaro spans 107,639 square feet and has forty-five rooms. The grounds include a 269,097 square-foot garden. The grounds of the castle also include a Catholic chapel dedicated to the Blessed Virgin Mary. The Statue of the Virgin of the Rosary, located in the chapel, is part of an annual celebration on the first Sunday of October, that includes a procession around the village, dating back to 1571.

The Counts of Sannazzaro have hosted various monarchs at the Castello Sannazzaro including the Marquesses and Dukes of Montferrat, King Charles Emmanuel IV of Sardinia in 1745, and Emperor Napoleon III and King Victor Emmanuel II in 1859.

Since 1986, the castle has been owned by Count Giussepe Sannazzaro, who runs it as a bed and breakfast. His daughter, Ludovica Sannazzaro, created a TikTok channel for the castle in 2021, receiving millions of views.
