= Borgo San Martino =

- Comune
- Comune di Borgo San Martino
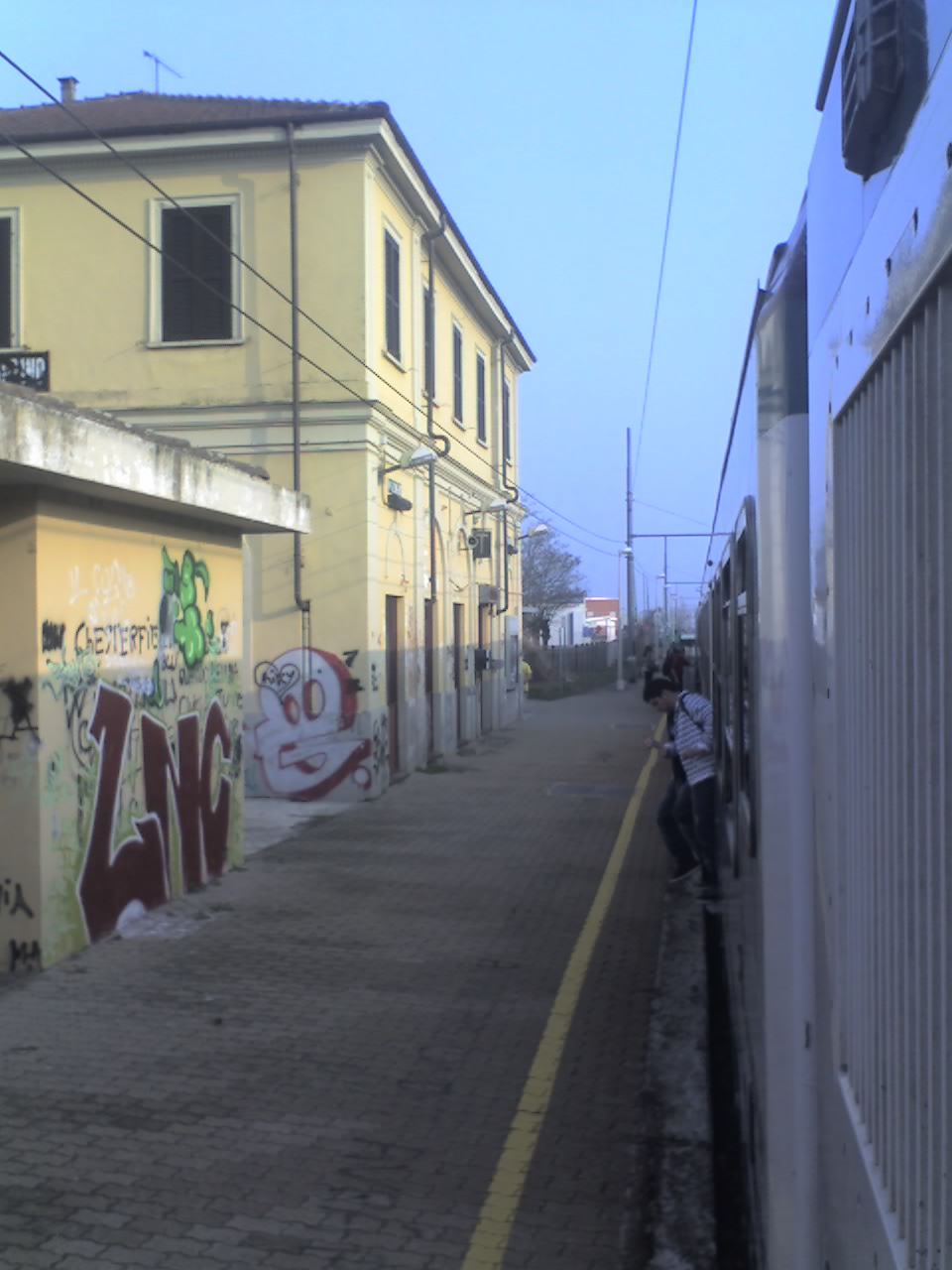

- Coat of arms

- Location within Italy Location within Piedmont
- Coordinates: 45°5′43″N 8°31′33″E
- Country: Italy
- Region: Piedmont
- Province: Alessandria (AL)

Government
  - Mayor: Mirco Capra (elected 16 May 2011)

Area
  - Total: 9.8 km^{2} (3.8 sq mi)
- Elevation: 107 m (351 ft)

Population (2005)
  - Total: 1,379
  - Density: 140/km^{2} (360/sq mi)
- Demonym: Borghigiani
- Time zone: UTC+1 (CET)
  - Summer (DST): UTC+2 (CEST)
- Postal code: 15032
- Dialing code: 0142
- Patron saint: Saints Quiricus and Julietta
- Saint day: 15 July

Borgo San Martino is a comune (municipality) in the Province of Alessandria in the Italian region Piedmont, located about 60 kilometres (37 mi) east of Turin and about 20 kilometres (12 mi) northwest of Alessandria.

Borgo San Martino borders the following municipalities: Casale Monferrato, Frassineto Po, Occimiano, Pomaro Monferrato, and Ticineto.
