= Grana del Monferrato =

Torrent stream

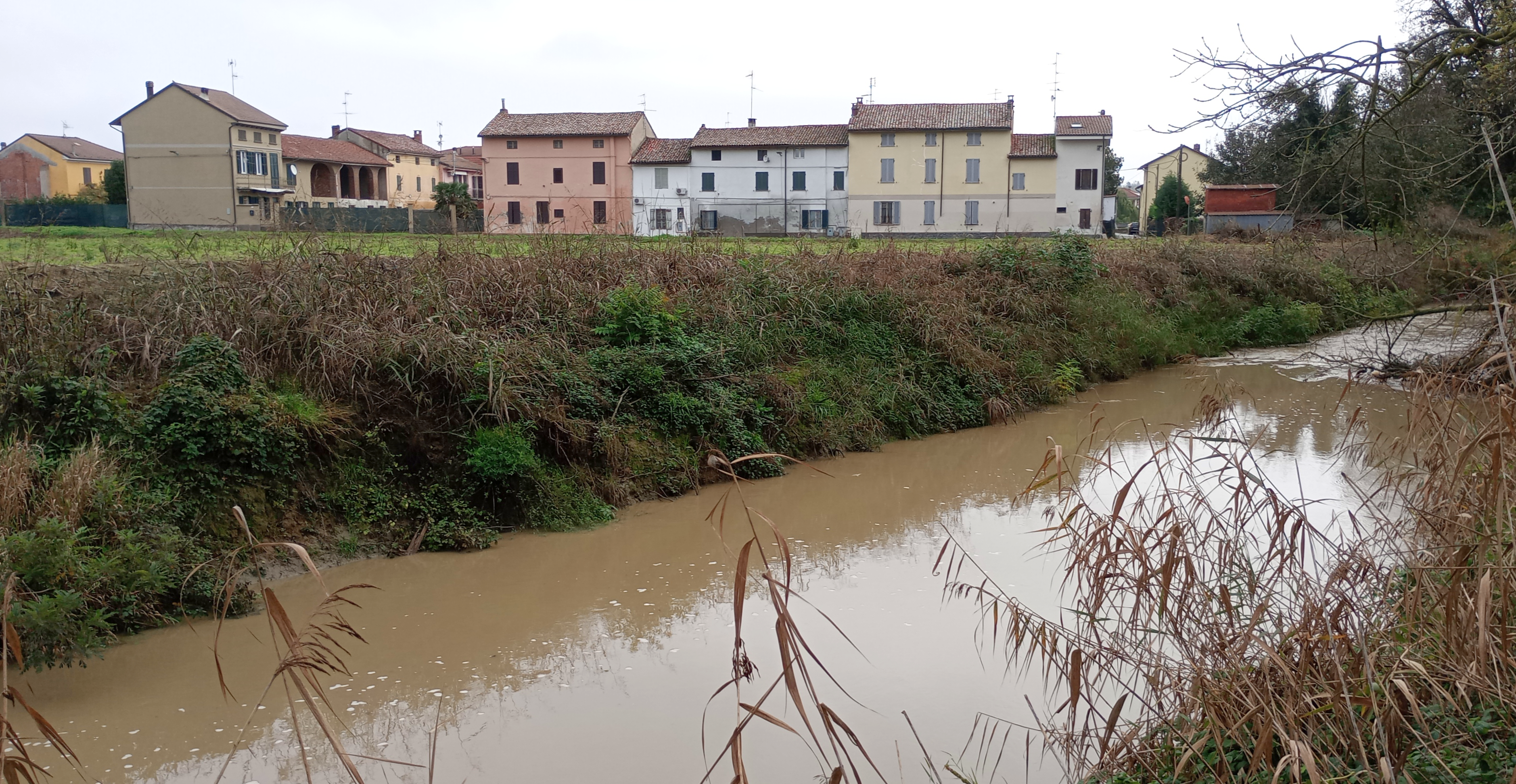

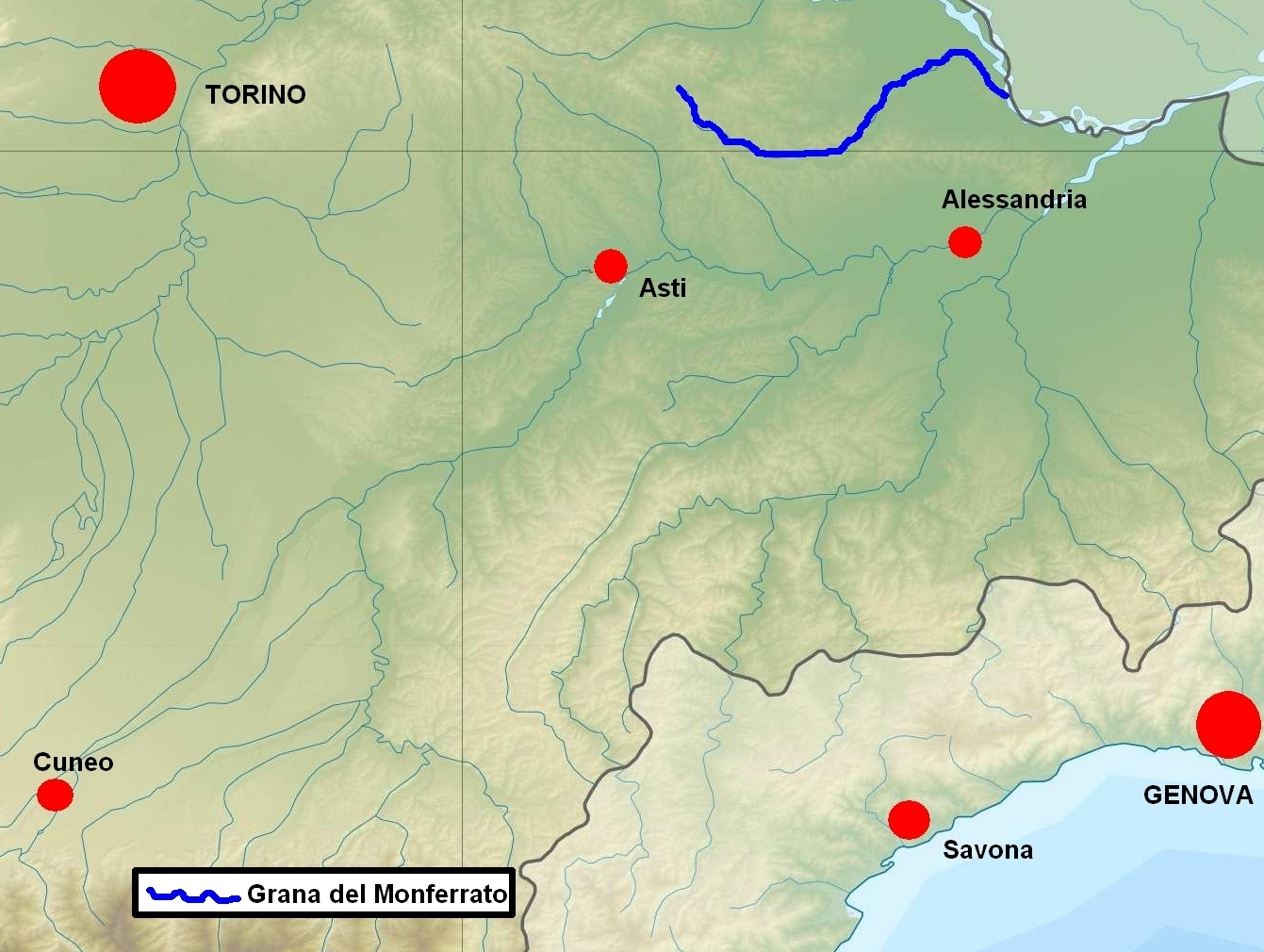
- Location within southern Piedmont

Location
- Country: Italy

Physical characteristics
- Source
  - location: near Grana, Province of Asti, Piedmont
  - elevation: 305 m (1,001 ft)
- Mouth
  - location: River Po northeast of Valenza
  - coordinates: 45.0206°N 8.6678°E
  - elevation: 88 m (289 ft)
- Length: 47 km (29 mi)
- Basin size: 192 km^{2} (74 mi^{2})
- Discharge
  - average: 2.2 m^{3}/s (78 cu ft/s) (close to its confluence with the Po)

Basin features
- Progression: Po→ Adriatic Sea

The Grana del Monferrato (to distinguish it from the Grana of the Province of Cuneo) is a small Italian river, classified as a torrente, a right tributary of the Po, which runs almost entirely in the Province of Alessandria among the hills of the Basso Monferrato which lie between the Po to the north and the Tanaro to the south. Notwithstanding its modest flow, it is the most significant Po tributary of the Basso Monferrato in terms of its length, the extent of its drainage basin and its discharge.

The river's course takes it through the comuni (municipalities) of Grana in the Province of Asti and Lu e Cuccaro Monferrato, Giarole, Pomaro Monferrato and Valenza in the Province of Alessandria. Its principal tributaries include the Auda and the Coda del Lupo.
