= Frassineto Po =

- Comune
- Comune di Frassineto Po
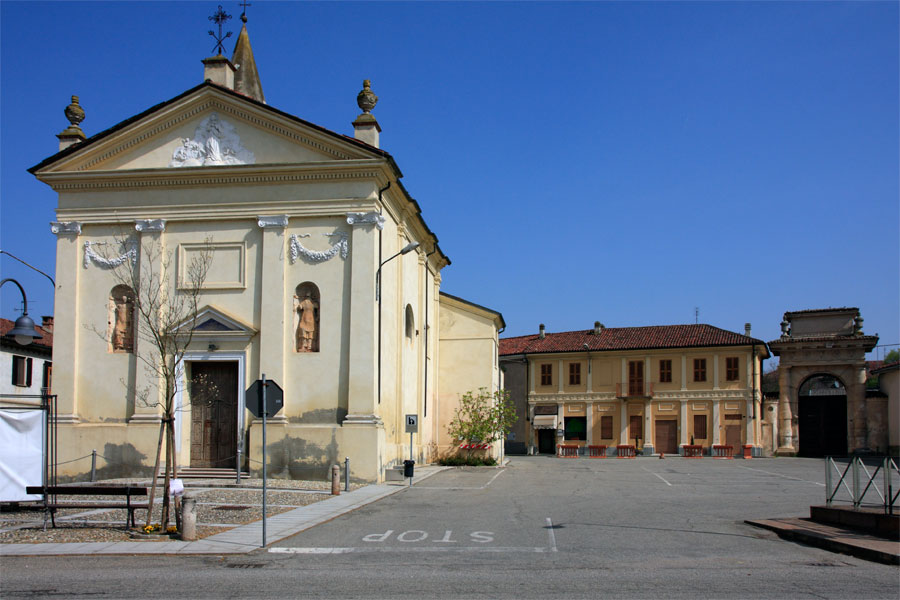

- Location within Italy Location within Piedmont
- Coordinates: 45°8′N 8°32′E
- Country: Italy
- Region: Piedmont
- Province: Province of Alessandria (AL)

Area
  - Total: 29.2 km^{2} (11.3 sq mi)
- Elevation: 104 m (341 ft)

Population (Dec. 2004)
  - Total: 1,462
  - Density: 50.1/km^{2} (130/sq mi)
- Demonym: Frassinetesi
- Time zone: UTC+1 (CET)
  - Summer (DST): UTC+2 (CEST)
- Postal code: 15040
- Dialing code: 0142
- Website: Official website

Frassineto Po is a comune (municipality) in the Province of Alessandria in the Italian region Piedmont, located about 70 kilometres (43 mi) east of Turin and about 25 kilometres (16 mi) north of Alessandria. As of 31 December 2004, it had a population of 1,462 and an area of 29.2 square kilometres (11.3 mi^{2}).

Frassineto Po borders the following municipalities: Borgo San Martino, Breme, Candia Lomellina, Casale Monferrato, Ticineto, and Valmacca.

== Demographic evolution ==
Historical population

Year	Pop.	±%
1861	2,311	—
1871	2,398	+3.8%
1881	2,520	+5.1%
1901	2,610	+3.6%
1911	2,278	−12.7%

Year	Pop.	±%
1921	2,009	−11.8%
1931	1,781	−11.3%
1936	1,707	−4.2%
1951	1,765	+3.4%
1961	1,718	−2.7%

Year	Pop.	±%
1971	1,534	−10.7%
1981	1,519	−1.0%
1991	1,363	−10.3%
2001	1,465	+7.5%

Source: Data from ISTAT
