= Ticineto =

- Comune
- Comune di Ticineto
- Coat of arms

- Location within Italy Location within Piedmont
- Coordinates: 45°6′N 8°33′E
- Country: Italy
- Region: Piedmont
- Province: Alessandria (AL)

Government
  - Mayor: Fiorenzo Scagliotti

Area
  - Total: 8.2 km^{2} (3.2 sq mi)
- Elevation: 102 m (335 ft)

Population (2005)
  - Total: 1,397
  - Density: 170/km^{2} (440/sq mi)
- Time zone: UTC+1 (CET)
  - Summer (DST): UTC+2 (CEST)
- Postal code: 15040
- Dialing code: 0142

Ticineto is a comune (municipality) in the Province of Alessandria in the Italian region Piedmont, located about 70 kilometres (43 mi) east of Turin and about 20 kilometres (12 mi) north of Alessandria.

Ticineto borders the following municipalities: Borgo San Martino, Frassineto Po, Pomaro Monferrato, and Valmacca.
