= Versa (Po) =

Location
- Country: Italy

Physical characteristics
- Mouth: Po
  - coordinates: 45.1007°N 9.3370°E

Basin features
- Progression: Po→ Adriatic Sea

The Versa is a right tributary of the river Po which runs through the Province of Pavia in northern Italy. It flows into the Po near Portalbera, southeast of the city Pavia.
