= Ludovica Sannazzaro =

Italian TikToker

- Education: American Musical and Dramatic Academy
- Occupation: TikToker
- Parent(s): Count Count Giuseppe Sannazzaro; Countess Letizia Sannazzaro

TikTok information
- Page: thecastlediary
- Followers: 1.7M
- Last updated: 11 August 2025
- Website: castellosannazzaro.it

Donna Ludovica di Sannazzaro Natta dei conti di Giarole is an Italian TikToker. In 2021, she created the TikTok channel The Castle Diary, where she makes videos about life in her family's ancestral home, the Castello Sannazzaro di Giarole.

== Biography ==
Sannazzaro is the daughter of Count Giuseppe Sannazzaro and Countess Letizia Sannazzaro. Her family descends from the Italian nobility. She grew up in her family's 12th-century castle, the Castello Sannazzaro di Giarole, in the Province of Alessandria. The castle has been in the Sannazzaro family for twenty-eight generations. Her father inherited the castle in 1986, but the family did not move in until 2006, previously using it as a summer residence. Sannazzaro was educated at a boarding school in Italy. After graduating, she moved to the United States, first to study theatre in Los Angeles, and then to New York City to attend the American Musical and Dramatic Academy, but returned to Italy during the COVID-19 pandemic.

She runs TikTok and Instagram accounts, called @thecastlediary, which chronicles what daily life in the castle looks like versus what people's expectations of castle life might be. Sannazzaro started the account on 7 March 2021, during the pandemic, which impacted the booking of the family castle, which they run as a bed and breakfast.
