= Po (river) =

River in Italy

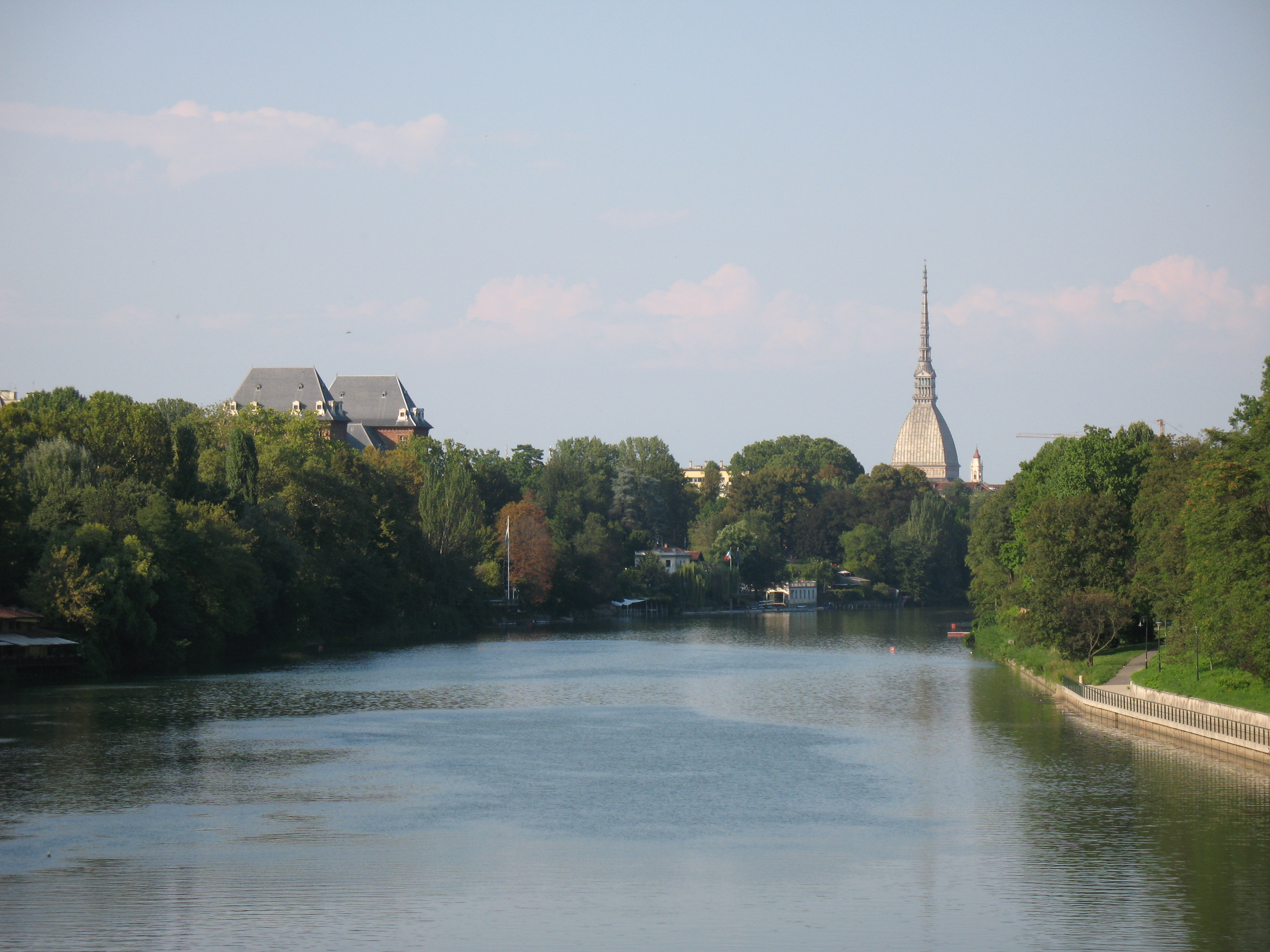
- The Po in Turin, Piedmont

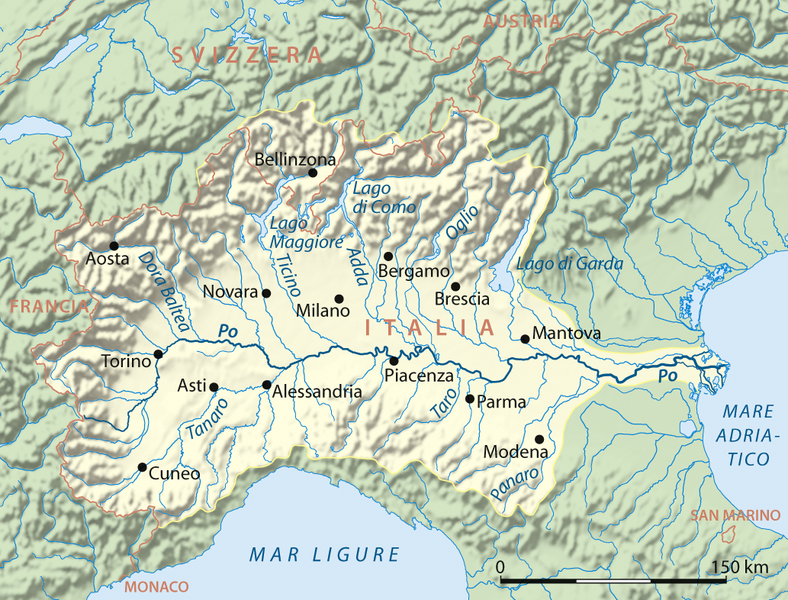
- Map of the Po watershed

Location
- Country: Italy
- Po Basin: Italy, Switzerland, France
- Cities: Turin, Cremona, Piacenza, Ferrara

Physical characteristics
- Source: Monte Viso
  - location: Near Crissolo, Piedmont, Italy
  - coordinates: 44°42′5″N 7°5′35″E
  - elevation: 3,700 m (12,100 ft)
- Mouth: Adriatic Sea
  - location: Near Adria, Veneto, Italy
  - coordinates: 44°57′9″N 12°25′55″E
  - elevation: 0 m (0 ft)
- Length: 652 km (405 mi)
- Basin size: 74,000 km^{2} (29,000 sq mi)
- Discharge
  - average: 1,540 m^{3}/s (54,000 cu ft/s)
  - maximum: 3,100 m^{3}/s (110,000 cu ft/s)

Basin features
- Tributaries
  - left: Dora Baltea, Ticino, Adda, Oglio, Mincio
  - right: Tanaro

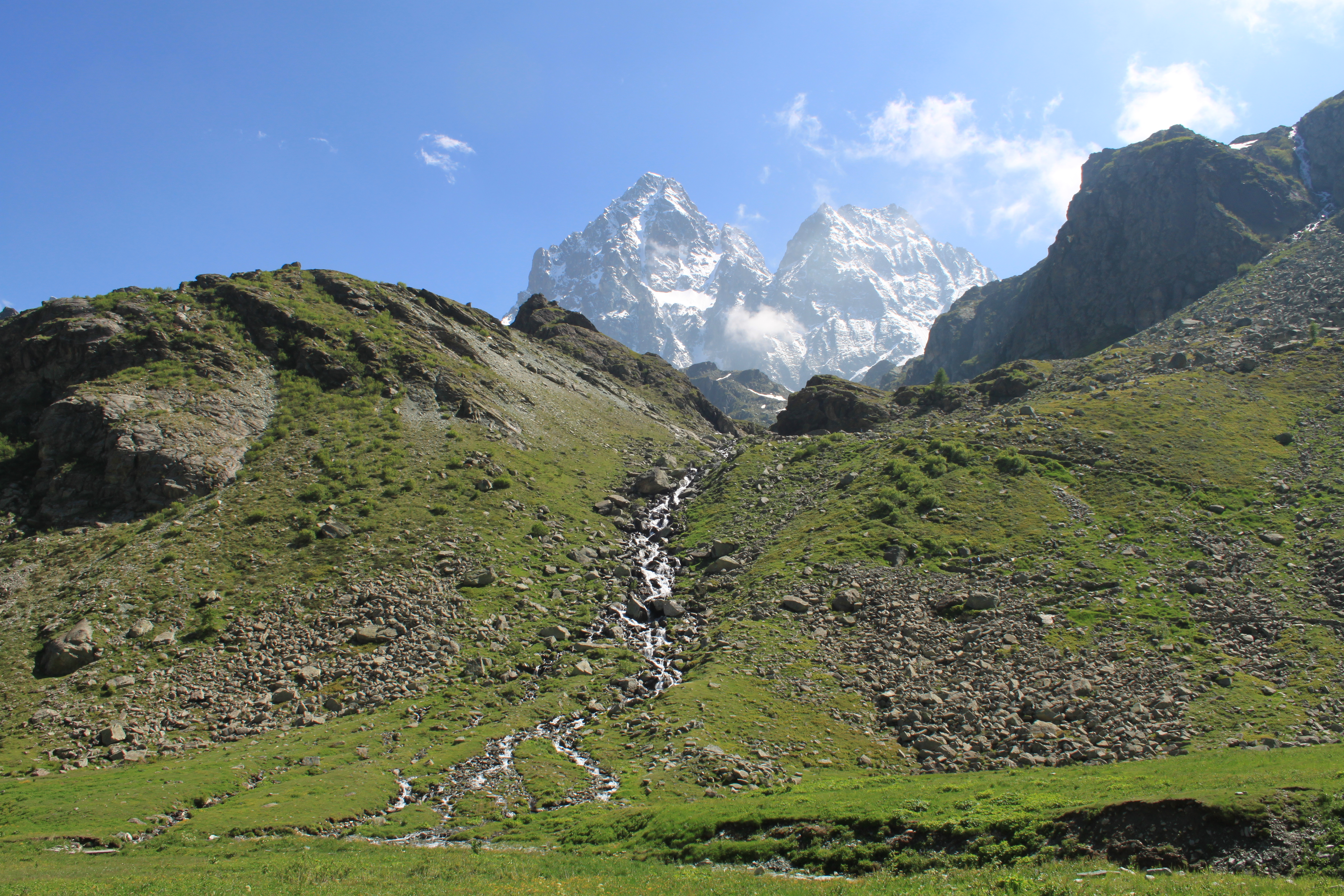
The source of Po river in Pian del Re on Monte Viso

The Po (/poʊ/ POH, Italian: [ˈpɔ]) is the longest river in Italy. It flows eastward across northern Italy, starting from the Cottian Alps. The river's length is 652 km (405 mi), or 682 km (424 mi) if the Maira, a right bank tributary, is included. The headwaters of the Po are formed by a spring seeping from a stony hillside at Pian del Re, a flat place at the head of the Val Po under the northwest face of Monviso. The Po then extends along the 45th parallel north before ending at a delta projecting into the Adriatic Sea near Venice.

Draining a basin of 74,000 km^{2} (29,000 sq mi), the Po is characterized by its large discharge (several rivers over 1,000 km have a discharge inferior or equal to the Po). It is, with the Rhône and Nile, one of the three Mediterranean rivers with the largest water discharge. As a result of its characteristics, the river is subject to heavy flooding. Consequently, over half its length is controlled with embankments.

The river flows through many important Italian cities, including Turin, Piacenza, Cremona and Ferrara. It is connected to Milan through a net of channels called navigli, which Leonardo da Vinci helped design. Near the end of its course, it creates a wide delta (with hundreds of small channels and five main ones, called Po di Maestra, Po della Pila, Po delle Tolle, Po di Gnocca and Po di Goro) at the southern part of which is Comacchio, an area famous for eels. The Po Valley was the territory of Roman Cisalpine Gaul, divided into Cispadane Gaul (south of the Po) and Transpadane Gaul (north of the Po).

== Geography ==
The Po has a drainage area of 74,000 km^{2} (29,000 sq mi) in all, 70,000 km^{2} (27,000 sq mi) of those being in Italy, of which 41,000 km^{2} (16,000 sq mi) is in montane environments and 29,000 km^{2} (11,000 sq mi) on the plain. The slope of the Po's river valley decreases from 0.35% in the west to 0.14% in the east, a low gradient. Along its path lie 450 standing lakes. Almost all of the rest of the non-Italy basin is in Switzerland, primarily in the canton of Ticino, which is essentially drained by the river Ticino rising in the Gotthard Area, and includes Lake Maggiore and Lake Lugano. A small part of the canton of Grisons drains to the Po, partly via the Ticino. The Simplon Valley in the canton of Valais is drained by the Diveria. A minute section of the Po basin belongs to France in the Vallée Étroite (literally, the Narrow Valley) running from Mont Thabor to the Italian ski resort of Bardonecchia. Although in France, Vallée Étroite is so remote that it is essentially administered by Italy (telephone network, rubbish collections, etc.). Further minuscule parts of the Po's basin (measurable in the hundreds of metres of linear distance) within France are found in the form of small streamheads forced into France by the 1947 Peace Treaty of Paris as a punitive measure against Italy. These can be found on the Mont Cenis and Mongenevre passes. The former contains a reservoir dammed at the Po end and so technically constitutes part of its basin, although it contributes little to the water flow as the water is, by definition, retained by the dam. The Po is the longest river in Italy; at its widest point it is 503 m (1,650 ft) across.

=== Po Valley ===
The vast valley around the Po is called the Po Basin or Po Valley (Italian Pianura Padana or Val Padana); the main industrial area and the largest agricultural area in the country, accounting for 35% of Italian agricultural production. In 2002, more than 16 million people lived in the area, at the time nearly one-third of the population of Italy.

The two main economic uses of the valley are for industry and for agriculture. The industrial centres, such as Turin and Milan, are located on higher terrain, away from the river. They rely for power on the numerous hydroelectric stations in or on the flanks of the Alps, and on the coal and oil power stations which use the water of the Po basin as coolant. Drainage from the north is mediated through several large, scenic lakes, commonly referred to as the Italian Lakes, and shared with Switzerland. The streams are now controlled by so many dams as to slow the river's sedimentation rate, causing geologic problems. The expansive, moist and fertile flood plain is reserved mainly for agriculture and is subject to flash floods, even though the overall quantity of water is lower than in the past and lower than demand. The main products of the farms around the river are cereals, including – unusually for Europe – rice, which requires heavy irrigation. The latter method is the chief consumer of surface water, while industrial and human consumption use underground water.

=== Tributaries ===
The Po has 141 tributaries. They include (R on the right bank, L on the left, looking downstream):

- Pellice (L)
- Varaita (R)
- Maira (R)
- Chisola (L)
- Sangone (L)
- Dora Riparia (L)
- Stura di Lanzo (L)
- Malone (L)
- Orco (L)
- Dora Baltea (L)
- Stura del Monferrato (R)
- Sesia (L)
- Rotaldo (R)
- Grana del Monferrato (R)
- Tanaro (R)
- Scrivia (R)
- Agogna (L)
- Curone (R)
- Staffora (R)
- Ticino (L)
- Versa (R)
- Tidone (R)
- Lambro (L)
- Trebbia (R)
- Nure (R)
- Adda (L)
- Arda (R)
- Taro (R)
- Parma (R)
- Enza (R)
- Crostolo (R)
- Oglio (L)
- Mincio (L)
- Secchia (R)
- Panaro (R)

The Reno (R) was a tributary of the Po until the middle of the eighteenth century, when the course was diverted to lessen the risk of devastating floods. The Tanaro is about 50 km (31 mi) longer than the upper Po at their confluence near Alessandria.

The longest tributaries of the Po are Adda (313 km), Oglio (280 km), Tanaro (276 km) and Ticino (248 km).

== Po Delta ==
=== Active delta ===
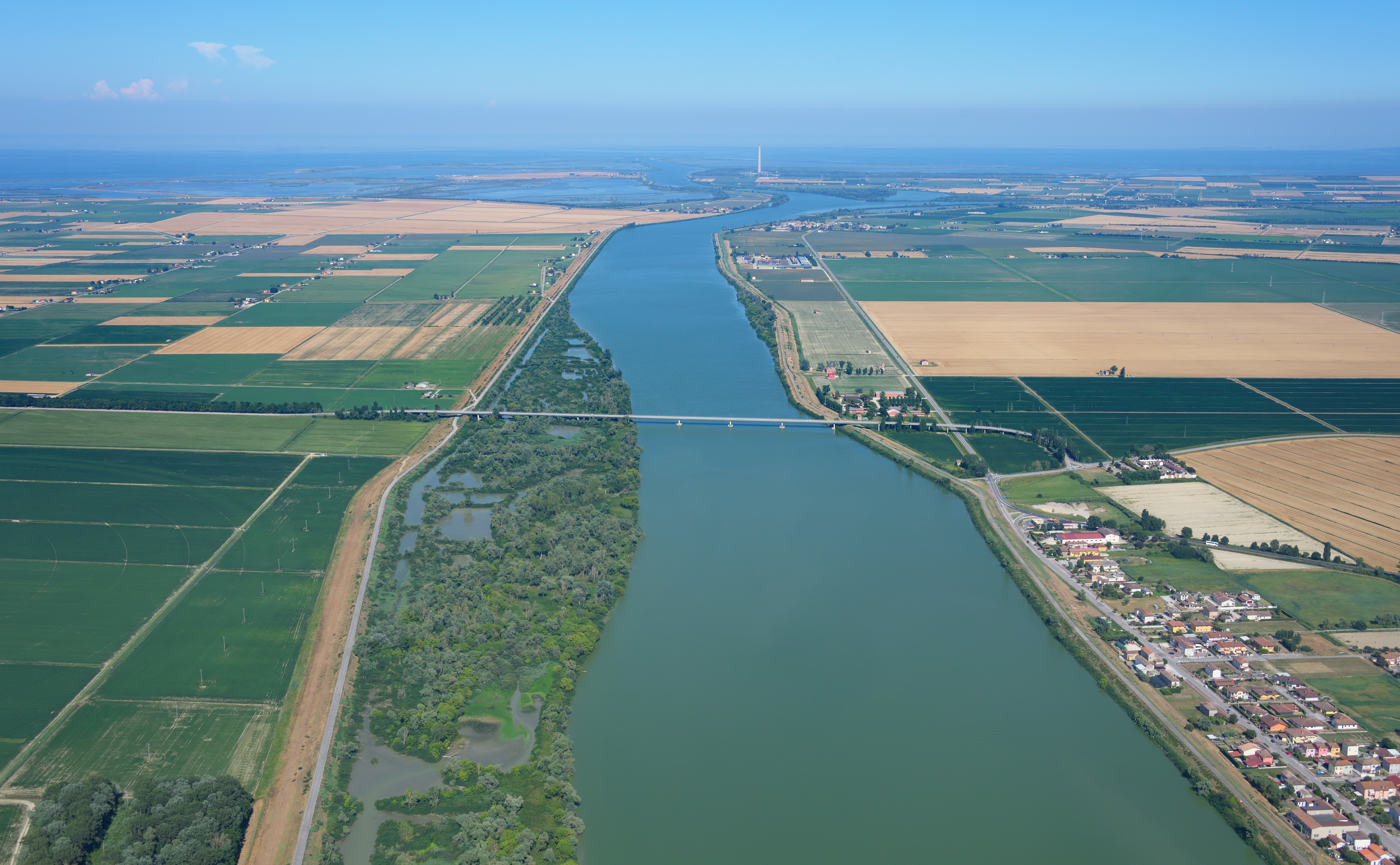
Aerial view of Po di Venezia, Po di Pila and Busa Dritta near the mouth at Punta Maistra

The most recent part of the delta, which projects into the Adriatic between Chioggia and Comacchio, contains channels that connect to the Adriatic and therefore is called the active delta by the park authorities, whereas the fossil delta contains channels that no longer connect the Po to the Adriatic (but once did). The active delta was created in 1604 when the city of Venice diverted the main stream, the Po grande or Po di Venezia, from its channel north of Porto Viro to the south of Porto Viro in a channel then called the Taglio di Porto Viro, "Porto Viro cut-off". Their intent was to stop the gradual migration of the Po toward the lagoon of Venice, which would have filled up with sediment had contact been made. The subsequent town of Taglio di Po grew around the diversionary works. The lock of Volta Grimana blocked the old channel, now the Po di Levante, which flows to the Adriatic through Porto Levante.

Below Taglio di Po the Parco Regionale Veneto, one of the tracts under the authority of the Parco Delta del Po, contains the latest branches of the Po. The Po di Gnocca branches to the south followed by the Po di Maestra to the north at Porto Tolle. At Tolle, downstream, the Po di Venezia divides into the Po delle Tolle to the south and the Po della Pila to the north. The former exits at Bonelli. The latter divides again at Pila into the Busa di Tramontana to the north and the Busa di Scirocco to the south, while the mainstream, the Busa Dritta, enters Punta Maistra and exits finally past Pila lighthouse.

Despite the park administration's definition of the active delta as beginning at Porto Viro, there is another active channel upstream from it at Santa Maria in Punta, where the Fiume Po divides into the Po di Goro and the Po di Venezia.

=== Fossil delta ===
The fossil Po is the region of no longer active channels from the Po to the sea. It begins upstream from Ferrara. The Fiume Po currently flowing to the north of Ferrara is the result of a diversion at Ficarolo in 1152 made in the hope of relieving flooding in the vicinity of Ravenna. The diversion channel was at first called the Po di Ficarolo. The Fiume Po before then followed the Po di Volano, no longer connected to the Po, which ran to the south of Ferrara and exited near Volano. In Roman times it did not exit there but ran to the south as the Padus Vetus ("old Po") exiting near Comacchio, from which split the Po di Primaro exiting close to Ravenna.

Before 1152, the seaward extension of today's delta, about 12 km (7.5 mi), did not exist. The entire region from Ravenna to Chioggia was dense swamps, explaining why the Via Aemilia was constructed between Rimini and Piacenza and did not begin further north.

=== Protected areas ===
Po
UNESCO World Heritage Site
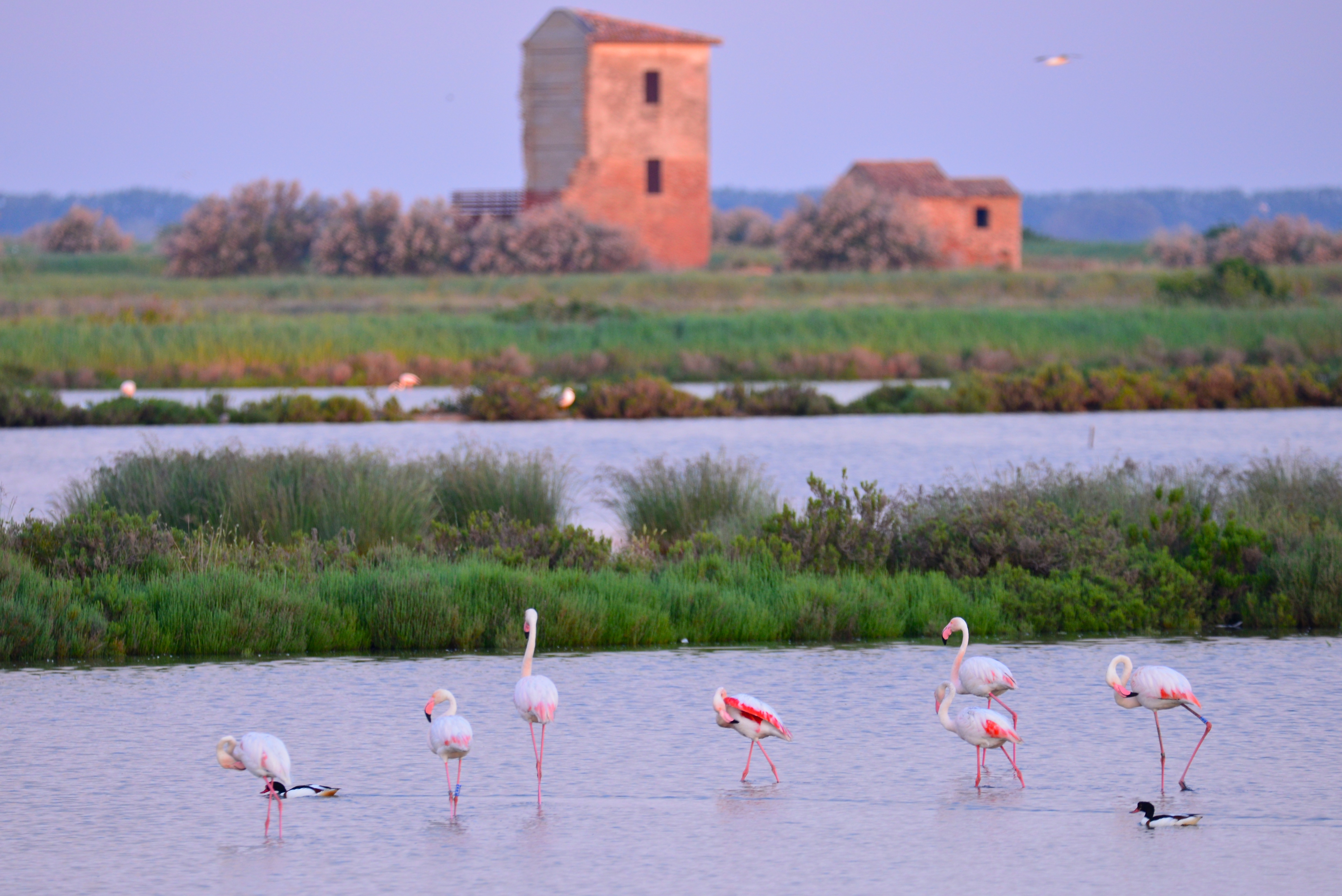
- Flamingoes in the Po Delta Regional Park
- Interactive map of Po
- Criteria: Cultural: ii, iii
- Reference: 733
- Inscription: 1995 (19th Session)

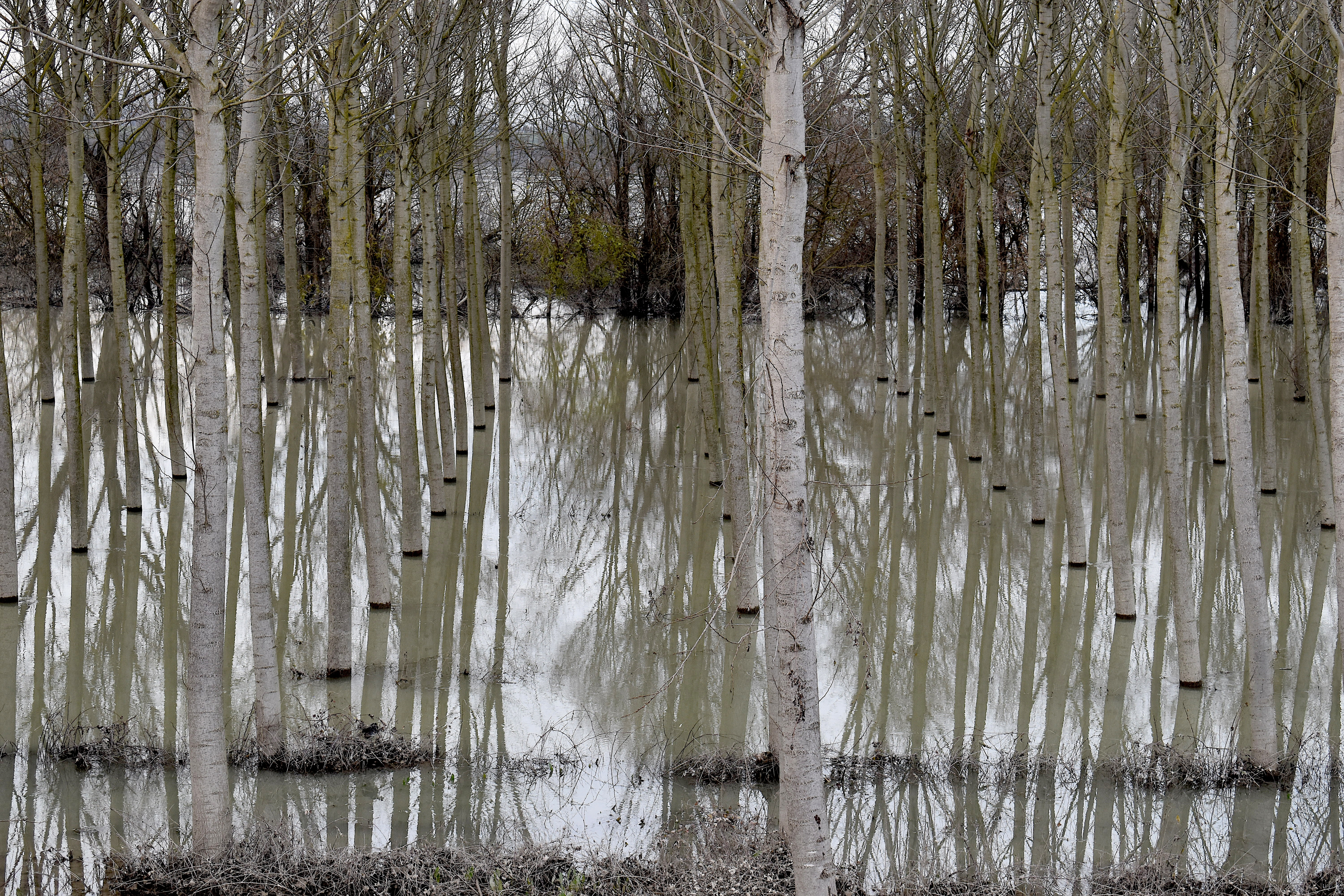
Typical Populus in "Fiume Po da Stellata a Mesola e Cavo Napoleonico" protected area

The Po Delta wetlands have been protected by the institution of two regional parks in the regions in which it is situated: Veneto and Emilia-Romagna. The Po Delta Regional Park in Emilia-Romagna, the largest, consists of four parcels of land on the right bank of the Po and to the south. Created by law in 1988, it was managed by a consortium, the Consorzio per la gestione del Parco, to which Ferrara and Ravenna provinces belong as well as nine comuni: Comacchio, Argenta, Ostellato, Goro, Mesola, Codigoro, Ravenna, Alfonsine, and Cervia. Executive authority resided in an assembly of the presidents of the provinces, the mayors of the comuni and the board of directors. They employed a Technical-Scientific Committee and a Park Council to carry out directives. In 1999, the park was designated a World Heritage Site by UNESCO and was added to "Ferrara, City of the Renaissance, and its Po Delta." From 2012 the park is managed by the Ente di Gestione per i Parchi e la Biodiversità - Delta del Po, composed by the comuni of Alfonsine, Argenta, Cervia, Codigoro, Comacchio, Goro, Mesola, Ostellato and Ravenna. The 53,653 ha (132,580 acres) of the park contain wetlands, forest, dunes and salt pans. It has a high biodiversity, with 1,000–1,100 plant species and 374 vertebrate species, of which 300 are birds.

== Geologic history ==
The Mediterranean Basin is a depression in the Earth's crust caused by the African Plate slipping under the Eurasian Plate. Typically, in geologic history, the depression is filled with sea water under various geologic names such as Tethys Sea. In the last period of the Miocene Epoch, the Messinian (7–5 mya), the Messinian salinity crisis, a near drying of the Mediterranean, was caused by the sea level dropping below the sill at the Strait of Gibraltar and the equilibrium between evaporation and replenishment shifting in favor of evaporation. At that time, the Po Valley and the Adriatic depression were a single canyon system thousands of feet deep. On the southwest, the Apennine Mountains bordered a land mass termed Tyrrhenis geologically. Their orogeny was just being completed in the Miocene. On the north the Alpine Orogeny had already created the Alps.

At the end of the Messinian, the ocean broke through the sill and the Mediterranean refilled. The Adriatic transgressed into all of northern Italy. In the subsequent Pliocene sedimentary outwash primarily from the Apennines filled the valley and the central Adriatic generally to a depth of 1,000 m (3,300 ft) to 2,000 m (6,600 ft) but from 2,000 m (6,600 ft) to 3,000 m (9,800 ft) off the current mouth of the Po, with pockets as deep as 6,000 m (20,000 ft). At the start of the Pleistocene the valley was full. Cycles of transgression and regression are detectable in the valley and the Adriatic as far as its centre and in the southern Adriatic.

From the Pleistocene, alternation of maritime and alluvial sediments occurs as far west as Piacenza. The exact sequences at various locations have been studied extensively. Apparently, the sea advanced and receded over the valley in conformance to an equilibrium between sedimentation and glacial advance or recession at 100,000-year intervals and 100 m (330 ft) to 120 m (390 ft) fluctuation of sea level. An advance began after the Last Glacial Maximum around 20,000 years ago, which brought the Adriatic to a high point at about 5,500 years ago.

Since then the Po delta had been prograding. The rate of coastal zone progradation between 1000 BC and 1200 AD was 4 m/yr. Human factors, however, brought about a change in the equilibrium in the mid-20th century, with the result that the entire coastline of the northern Adriatic is now degrading. Venice, which was originally built on islands off the coast, is most at risk due to subsidence, but the effect is realized in the Po delta as well. The causes are first a decrease in the sedimentation rate due to the locking of sediment behind hydroelectric dams and the deliberate excavation of sand from rivers for industrial purposes. Second, agricultural use of the river is heavy; during peak consumption, the flow in places nearly dries up, causing local contention. As a result of decreased flow, salt water is intruding into the aquifers and coastal ground water. Eutrophication in standing waters and streams of low flow is on the increase. The valley is subsiding due to the extraction of ground water.

== Human impacts ==
Principal human impacts on the Po River include pollution, dams, flood control, and measures to improve and maintain navigation.

=== Pollution ===
Always prone to fog, the valley is subject to heavy smog due to industrial atmospheric emissions, especially from Turin.

The city of Milan had no sewage treatment plants. Sewage went through channels directly into the Po, for which the European Environment Agency cited the city. Since 2005, all sewage from Milan is treated in plants at Nosedo, San Rocco and Peschiera Borromeo. These treat the sewage from over 2.5 million inhabitants.

In 2005, water from the Po was found to contain much benzoylecgonine, passed by cocaine users in urine. Based on these figures, cocaine consumption was estimated to be about 4 kg daily, or 27 doses per day per thousand young adults in the drainage basin – nearly three times higher than estimated.

On 24 February 2010, the Po was contaminated by an oil spill coming from a refinery in Villasanta through the Lambro, the Agenzia Nazionale Stampa Associata news agency has estimated it to be about 600,000 litres.

=== Water resource management ===
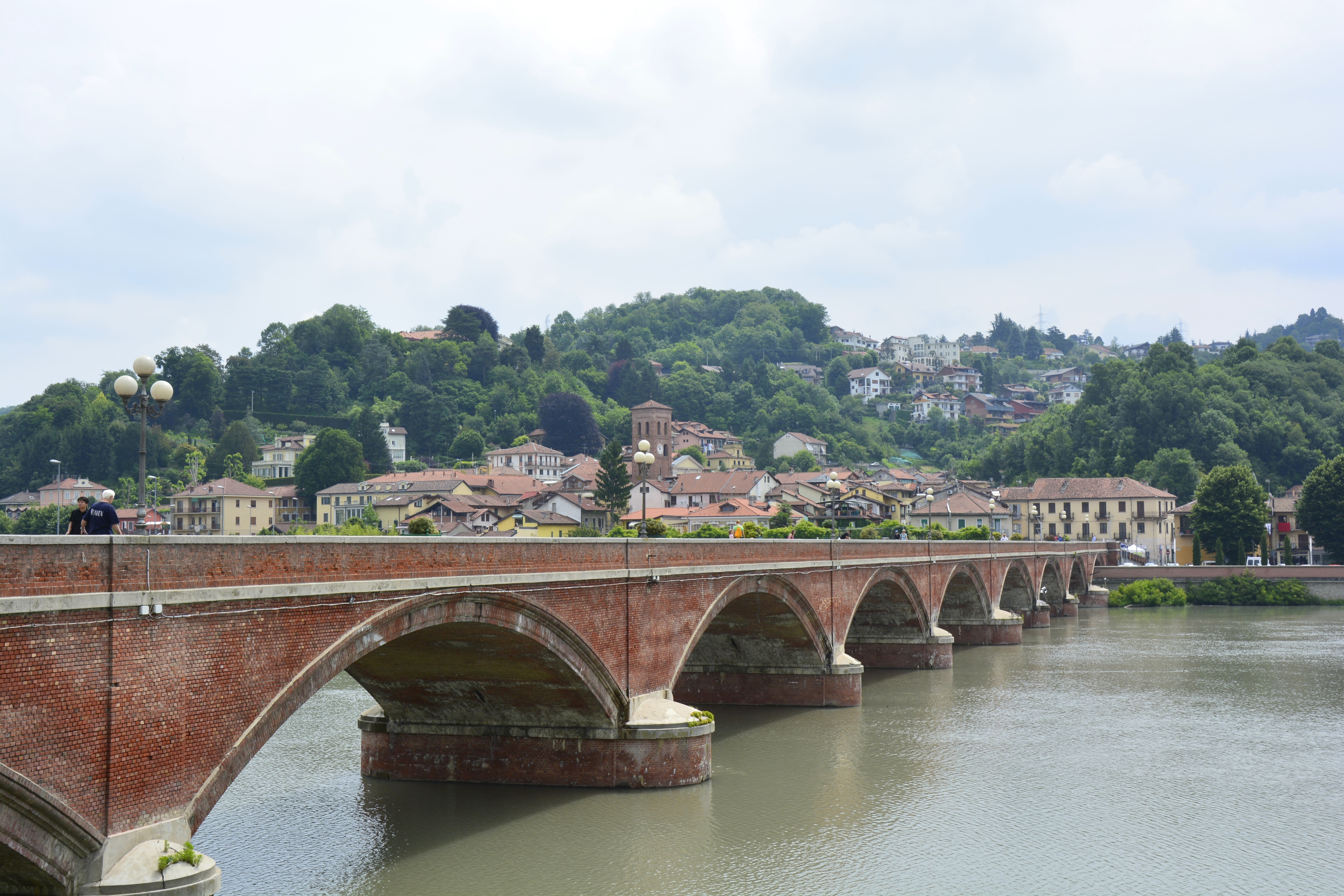
Bridge over Po river in San Mauro Torinese

Until 1989, water resources were administered regionally or locally. The major authority on the lower Po was the Magistrato alle Acque di Venezia, first formed in the 16th-century Republic of Venice. It made all the decisions concerning the diversion of the lower river. Most part of the delta is still in Veneto.

In 1907, under the Kingdom of Italy the agency became the Magistrato alle Acque and took responsibility for all the water resources in northeastern Italy. Currently it is a decentralized institution of the Ministry of Public Works, headed by a chairman appointed by the Head of State and the Council of Ministers. Its headquarters are in Venice. Its domain is the management and protection of the water system in Veneto, Mantua, Trento, Bolzano and Friuli-Venezia Giulia.

In 1989, in response to the major geologic problems that were developing along the river, Law No. 183/89 was passed authorizing The Po Basin Water Board (Autorità di bacino del fiume Po), which would direct operations concerning all the water resources in the Po basin (see under Po Valley). Its headquarters have been in Parma since its inception in 1990. It considers itself a synergy among all the institutions concerned with the preservation and development of the Po basin. It is administered by officials chosen from the administrations of the constituent regions and provinces.

In 2009 the water board began its Integrated River Basin Management Plan to meet the European Union (EU) Water Framework Directive, 2000/60/EC. This takes in water management and flood risk plans antecedent. Between 2009 and 2015 the Po Valley Project (the implementation of the plan) took more than 60 measures, notably to: heighten and strengthen levees, increase flood-meadows, resume natural sediment transport and deposition points, enlarge wetlands, afforest, re-nature, promote biodiversity and recreational use.

=== Navigation ===
In Roman times the waterway was navigable as far upstream as Turin. Today the waterway is navigable for substantial craft (up to 1350 tonnes—the European Class IV waterway standard) from Cremona to the river delta on the Adriatic. Passage by smaller vessels is available for some distance above Cremona. In the lower reaches, the surrounding basin is generally flat and it is served by a complicated network of small canals linked to the river. However, transit is severely hampered during summer months by low water levels.

=== Dams ===
At the village of Isola Serafini in the comune of Monticelli d'Ongina, Piacenza Province, 40 km (25 mi) downstream from Piacenza, a 362 m (1,188 ft) long, 20 m (66 ft) high gate dam featuring eleven 30 m (98 ft) openings gated by vertical lift gates, crosses the Po. Nine gates are 6.5 m (21 ft) high, and two are 8 m (26 ft) high for sediment-scouring purposes. A spillway to the right passes through a hydroelectric station of 4 generators of 76 MW each operated by a 3.5–11 m (11–36 ft) head of water. The spillway connects to a diversionary canal subtending a 12 km (7.5 mi) loop of the Po. A ship lock 85 m (279 ft) long and 12 m (39 ft) wide next to the station passes some traffic through the canal, but above the dam, traffic is mainly barges. The average flow at the dam is 854 m^{3}/s, with a 12,800 m^{3}/s maximum.

=== Drought ===
The historic average flow for June is 1,805 cubic metres per second. In late June 2022, the flow measured in Ferrara fell below an average of 145 cubic metres per second. Climate change has caused several droughts across Northern Italy, with predictions for their frequency and the severity, resulting in a "decrease in precipitation during critical crop growing seasons". In July 2022, the Italian government declared a state of emergency in the regions Emilia-Romagna, Lombardy, Piedmont, Veneto and Friuli-Venezia Giulia. Water levels decreased and revealed large riverbed areas and lost objects.

== Cultural history ==
The Po is first identified by name in the Graeco-Roman historians and geographers of the late Roman Republic and the early Roman Empire, long after the valley had been occupied successively by prehistoric and historic peoples: Ligures, Etruscans, Celts, Veneti, Umbri, and Romans. At that late date, the ancient authors were attempting to explain the provenance of the name. Perhaps the earliest of these, Polybius (2nd century BC), uses Pados (in Greek) and says that it was to be identified with the Eridanos of the poets. Moreover, the country people call it Bodencus.

This implies that a "country" population either remained from prehistoric times or adopted the name in use by that substrate. The name has been segmented as Bod-encus or Bod-incus, the suffix being characteristic of the ancient Ligurian language of northern Italy, southern France, Corsica and elsewhere.

Pliny the Elder has the most to say about the Padus of his times. Herodotus had expressed doubt concerning the existence of a river in Europe, Eridanos, which flowed into the northern sea, he said, from which amber came. He believed it was a Greek name (there are other Eridanos rivers in Greece), "invented by some poet," but makes no conjectures as to where it might be. Pliny points out that in his own time the Eridanos had become wrongly identified with the Padus. He does not know when or how, but like Herodotus, he blames the poets. Amber is supposed to have come from there. Phaëthon, son of the sun, struck by lightning, changed into poplars and exuded tears every year, which is the source of amber (a myth of Pausanias). Expressing surprise at the ignorance of the poets, Pliny says "There can be no doubt that amber is the product of the islands of the northern ocean (Baltic Sea)" and attributes its introduction into the Po Valley to the Veneti, the last link in a trade route to the north through Pannonia.

Pliny (Hist. Nat., iii. 122) also gives the Ligurian name of the Po as Bodincus, which he translates as "bottomless". The root bod- has been generally analyzed as containing the PIE base *bhu(n)d(h)- seen in Sanskrit budhnah and Avestan buna- "bottom", Greek pythmen "foundation", Latin fundus "bottom", Old Irish bond "sole of the foot". The word Bodincus appears in the place name Bodincomagus, a Ligurian town on the right bank of the Po downstream from today's Turin. The Po, along with other rivers in northern Italy, was the scene of numerous military episodes throughout the Middle Ages, and all the major cities and coastal lordships were equipped with real river fleets. Particularly violent were the clashes between the naval squads of the Ghibelline municipalities (Cremona and Pavia) and those of the municipalities of the Lombard league during the thirteenth century and between the Venetian fleet and that of the Duchy of Milan in the fifteenth century.

=== Mythology ===
The Po is often identified with the Eridanos or Eridanus river of Greek mythology. This mythical river is the namesake of the constellation Eridanus.

== See also ==
- Lunghin Pass (triple watershed: Po-Rhine-Danube)
- Mont-Cenis Lake
- Witenwasserenstock (triple watershed: Rhone-Rhine-Po)
