= Valenza =

Valenza Valensa (Piedmontese)
- Comune
- Comune di Valenza
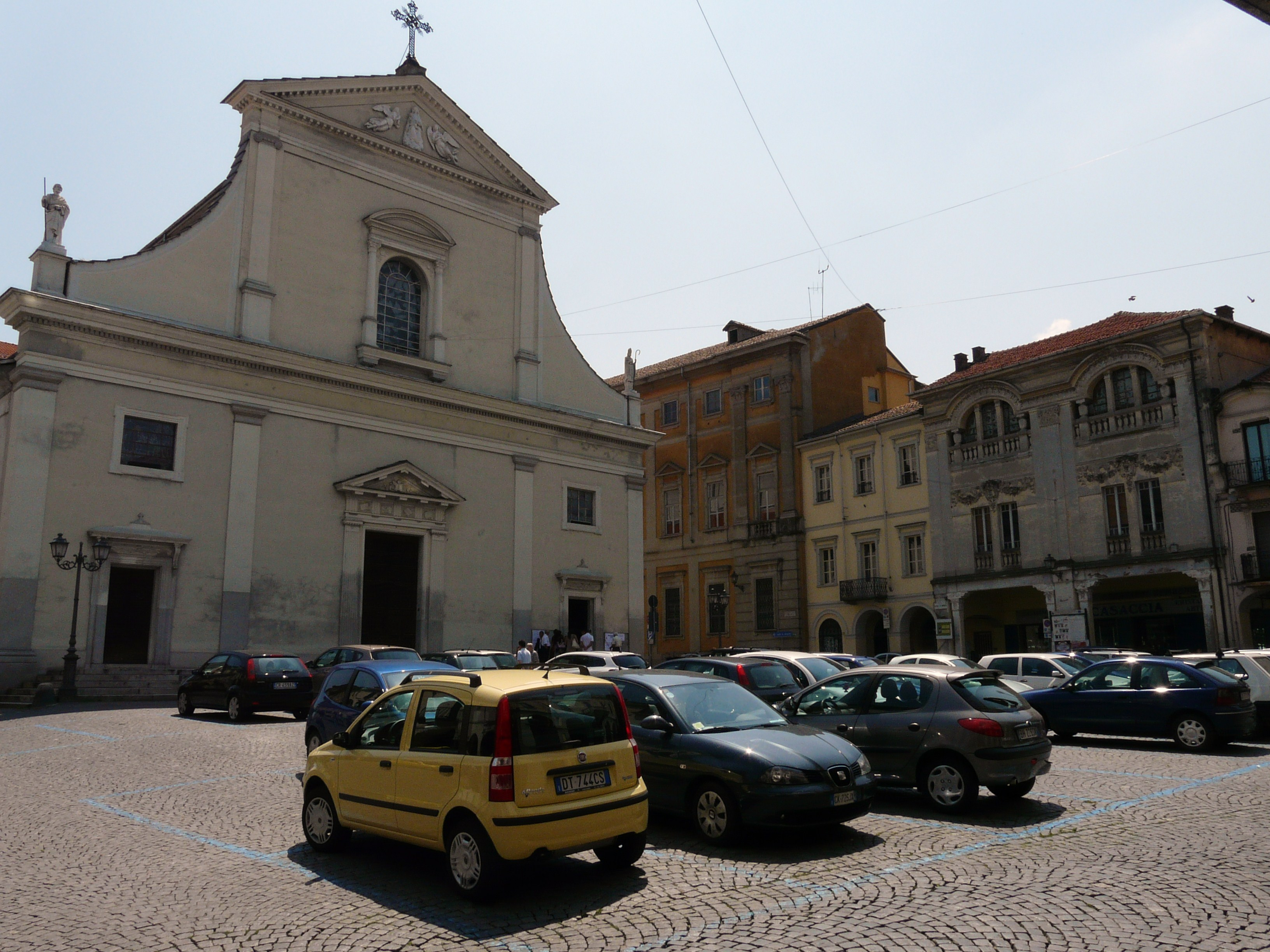

- Coat of arms

- Location within Italy Location within Piedmont
- Coordinates: 45°1′N 8°39′E
- Country: Italy
- Region: Piedmont
- Province: Alessandria (AL)
- Frazioni: Villabella, Montevalenza

Government
  - Mayor: Maurizio Oddone

Area
  - Total: 48.49 km^{2} (18.72 sq mi)
- Elevation: 125 m (410 ft)

Population (31 December 2020)
  - Total: 18,239
  - Density: 376.1/km^{2} (974.2/sq mi)
- Demonym: Valenzani
- Time zone: UTC+1 (CET)
  - Summer (DST): UTC+2 (CEST)
- Postal code: 15048
- Dialing code: 0131
- Website: Official website

Valenza (Piedmontese: Valensa or Valensá) is a comune (municipality) in the Province of Alessandria in the Italian region Piedmont, located about 80 kilometres (50 mi) east of Turin and about 11 kilometres (7 mi) north of Alessandria, in the extreme Montferrat’s offshoots, in the Lombardy’s border.

It is sometimes called “Valenza Po”.

It is also one of the principal zones in the Alessandria’s province, due to its schools poles and the hospital.

== History ==
A stronghold of the Ligures, it was conquered by the Romans in the 2nd century BC, and became a forum as Forum Fulvii Valentinum, having law jurisdiction and a market. After the fall of the Western Roman Empire, most of the population moved from the hills of the previous settlement to live where the current town is. It was ravaged by the Burgundians and ruled by the Lombards. After the Frank conquest of northern Italy, it became part of the mark of Montferrat.

Overshadowed by the power of the nearby Alessandria, it attracted the attentions of Galeazzo I Visconti, duke of Milan, but his plot to capture the city failed. The Viscount were however able to conquer Valenza in 1370. Later the town was sacked by the French troops (1499 and 1515), reconquered by the Spaniards (1521) under Charles V (1521) and then again captured by the French (1523). However, in the latter year it was given back to Charles V. Again surrendered to the French in 1557, it finally was assigned to Spain in 1559 by the Treaty of Cateau-Cambrésis.

In 1635, during the Thirty Years' War, Valenza resisted for 60 days a siege from French, Parmense and Savoyard troops. During the later part of the Franco-Spanish War (1635–59), it again withstood a French siege in 1641, but in 1656, after 70 days of siege, it capitulated to French, Savoyard and Modenese troops.

Valenza was besieged again in 1696, but this time the French and Savoyards were unable to capture it. In 1707, in the course of the War of Spanish Succession, it was conquered by Victor Amadeus II of Savoy, who had its possession confirmed in 1713 by the Treaty of Utrecht. Thenceforth Valenza followed Piedmontese-Sardinian history, and after 1861 that of the kingdom of Italy.

The city of Valenza in collaboration with the Brotherhood of San Bernardino reward every year since 1988 the best jeweler with the statuette of San Eligio. This statuette aims to reward the artisans who help the city of Valenza building the reputation of Italian Capital Jewelry.

== Twin towns ==
- Rocca Imperiale, Italy
