= Lomellina =

Lomellina Ümlina (Lombard)
- Area in the Province of Pavia
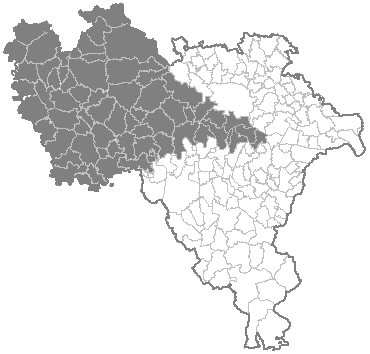
- The Lomellina within the Province of Pavia

- Location of the Lomellina in Italy
- Coordinates: 45°19′00″N 8°52′00″E
- Country: Italy
- Region: Lombardy
- Province: Pavia (PV)
- Seat: Vigevano
- Comuni: 58

Area
  - Total: 1,240 km^{2} (480 sq mi)

Population (2011)
  - Total: 214,494
  - Density: 173/km^{2} (448/sq mi)
- Time zone: UTC+1 (CET)
  - Summer (DST): UTC+2 (CEST)
- Website: Official website

The Lomellina (Western Lombard: Ümlina or Lümelina) is a geographical and historical area in the Po Valley of northern Italy, located in south-western Lombardy between the Sesia, Po and Ticino rivers. It is one of three areal divisions of the Province of Pavia.

== Geography ==
Lomellina includes 58 comuni (municipalities), the most important today being Vigevano and Mortara; the name however derives from its ancient capital Lomello. The area is particularly renowned for its rice paddies: the crop has been cultivated here since the sixteenth century.

== History ==
In ancient times Lomellina was inhabited by the Ligurian tribes of the Laevi, and the Marici (co-founders of Ticinum, the modern Pavia) and the Libici (founders of Vercelli). Later they were Romanized. Although crossed by an important road connecting Ticinum to Augusta Taurinorum (the modern Turin), the region seems not to have been intensively urbanized under the Romans, with the exception of the area of Vigevano.

With the fall of the Western Roman Empire and the arrival of the Lombards, who set their capital in Pavia, Lomellina acquired importance, with a comital dynasty (Conti di Lomello) rising in Lomello. The city of Pavia conquered Lomello in 1146, and the area was later under the Visconti, as part of the Duchy of Milan.

In 1707, after the War of the Spanish Succession, a part of Lomellina was conquered by the Piedmontese House of Savoy and made an autonomous province. The area of Vigevano and Robbio, called Contado di Vigevano and which had been autonomous since 1532, was also acquired by Piedmont in 1743.

In 1859 the administrative reform promoted by Urbano Rattazzi annexed Lomellina to the province of Pavia just conquered from Austria, becoming later part of the newly formed Kingdom of Italy.

== Gallery ==
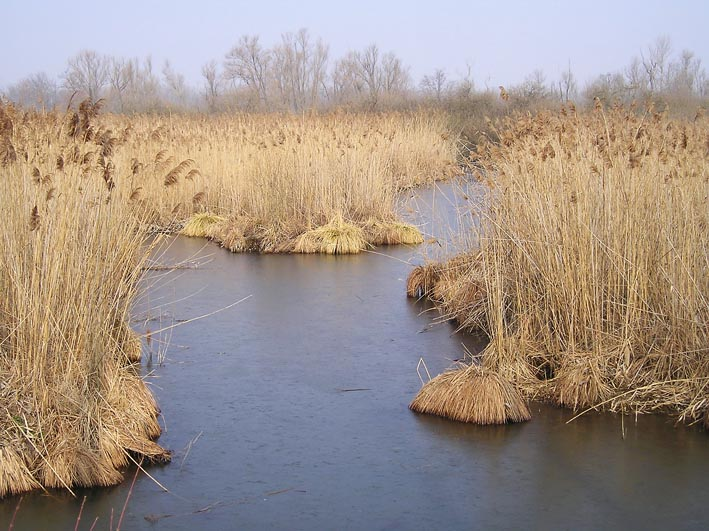
The lake of Sartirana Lomellina

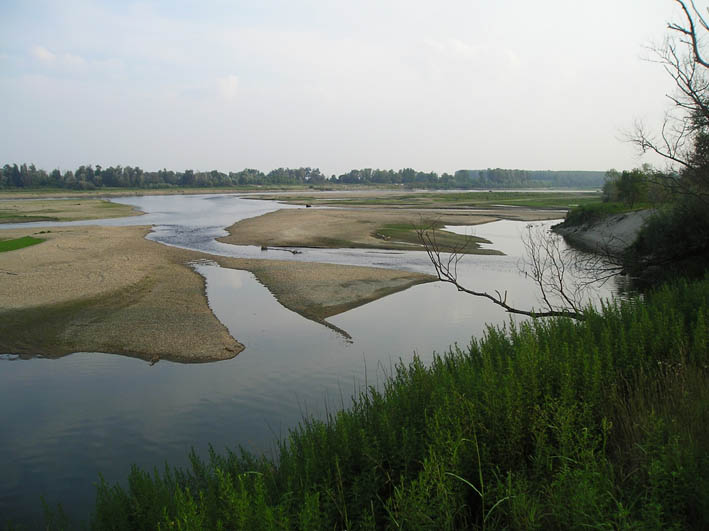
Po River near Balossa Bigli, a hamlet of Mezzana Bigli

== See also ==
- Province of Pavia
- Pavese
- Oltrepò Pavese
- History of Cilavegna
