= History of Cilavegna =

History of the municipality of Cilavegna, Italy

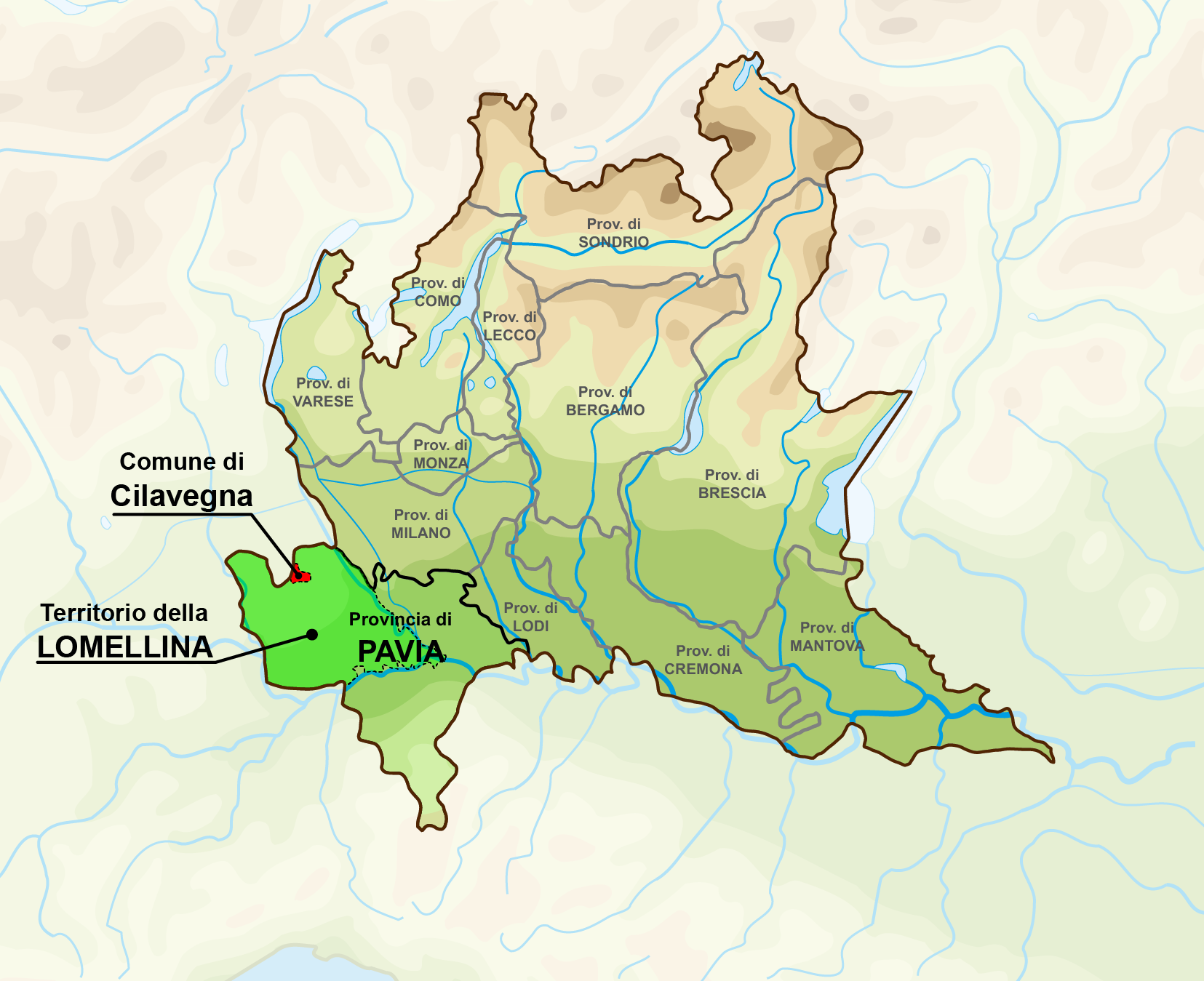
Location of Cilavegna and Lomellina within modern Lombardy.

The history of Cilavegna, an Italian municipality located in Lomellina, begins from the Iron Age, when those territories were inhabited by the people of Laevi. (Note: Further findings, however, would suggest occupation prior to this period, placing the appearance of the first settlements as early as around 5000 BCE.) In the following centuries, moreover, there were many populations that occupied Lomellina and, for the specific territory of Cilavegna, the Roman one was the most significant one: in fact, it is attested that along a Roman road a nucleus called cella ad vineas was created, an encampment to refresh the marching troops. Another noteworthy period was from the end of the Early Middle Ages to the beginning of the Late Middle Ages, during which the settlement of Cilavinnis was first mentioned. Later, in feudal times, several families alternated in the possession of the locality: among all are mentioned the Palatine counts of Lomello, but above all the Atellani and the Taverna families, who played an important role in the town in modern times. Between the 16th and 19th centuries Cilavegna was conquered and occupied, for longer or shorter periods, by the French, Spanish and Austrians, until it was annexed to the Kingdom of Italy.

== Ancient age ==
Origin of the name

The toponym Cilavegna is almost certainly derived from a compound form of two Latin terms: the first part is the word cella, which recalls the meaning of military annona depot, i.e., a typical Roman settlement along the roads of the Empire; the second term, vegna, indicates the ancient cultivation prevalent in this place: vineyards.

In Lomellina, the region where Cilavegna is located, there are finds that testify to human presence since the Mesolithic, when flint working was typical (several finds come from excavations near Vigevano, Gambolò and Gravellona). Other finds dating back to the Neolithic help to understand how those populations were linked, as early as 5,000 B.C., to agriculture and animal husbandry.

Populations of Celts, Ligures and Veneti in Cisalpine Gaul.

Later, with progressive sedentarization, the production of ceramic containers (dating back to the Eneolithic) developed, but above all metalworking. The Bronze Age inaugurated this phase and was characterized by the considerable increase of human presence in Lomellina, evidenced by the various finds concerning new funerary practices as well (in 1986 tombs dating back to 1300 B.C. were found in Cilavegna).

With the beginning of the Iron Age the Golasecca culture spread to Lomellina, which contributed to the development of the ancient Ligurian population, particularly the Laevi branch. They built real villages thanks to the facilities offered by the proximity of the Ticino River, and the growing development allowed them to become trading partners with the other Ligurian population of the Libui and with the Etruscans; the latter, however, did not limit themselves to a simple coalition with the Laevi and in the 8th century BC invaded the territories of northern Italy (thus including Lomellina), forming the Padanian Etruria.

Livy recalls the Laevi with the following words:

Libui considunt post hos Salluuiique, prope antiquam gentem Laeuos Ligures incolentes circa Ticinum amnem.
After them, Libui and Salluvi settled with the ancient Ligurian Laevi people living in the vicinity of the Ticino River.

— Livy, Ab Urbe condita libri, V, 35

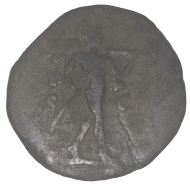
Roman coin found in Lomellina

The Gallic invasions of the 4th century B.C. caused the end of the Etruscan presence in Lomellina, initiating the La Tène culture. From this period on, vine cultivation developed in the territory, which led, in the early 2nd century B.C., to the development of a particular vessel: the whirligig vase. (Note: Evidence of the Celtic presence in Lomellina is the still existing Galliana Street.) Thus it was a phase of important productive growth, especially in the areas where settlements had sprung up: these areas, called hlau hmell, consisted of small elevations close to watercourses, where agriculture could flourish with the cultivation of barley, wheat, panicum and millet. The most flourishing period, however, occurred with the Romans.

The first indications of the presence of an encampment in the Cilavegnese area date back to the Roman rule over Cisalpine Gaul (1st century BC - 5th century AD). During this period, in fact, a nucleus called Cella ad vineas arose within the Regio XI Transpadana: it consisted of a castrum similar to those built along Roman roads and functioned as an encampment to refresh the marching armies; in particular, the road that crossed Cilavegna united Vercelli with Vigevano and also crossed the Galliana road, which started from Mortara and continued in the direction of Galliate. The existence of the road section as early as Roman times is confirmed by an indirect source: in the 10th century, in a concession made by King Berengar I to the bishop of Pavia, he included a section of the ancient road among the territories held by the village. Also mentioned in that document was an ancient church, dating back to Roman times (5th century AD), which constituted the first Christian religious settlement in the village; later the building would be replaced by the parish church, and so it is difficult to give a structural description of it, as well as its initial dedication.

== Middle Ages ==
=== Early Middle Ages ===
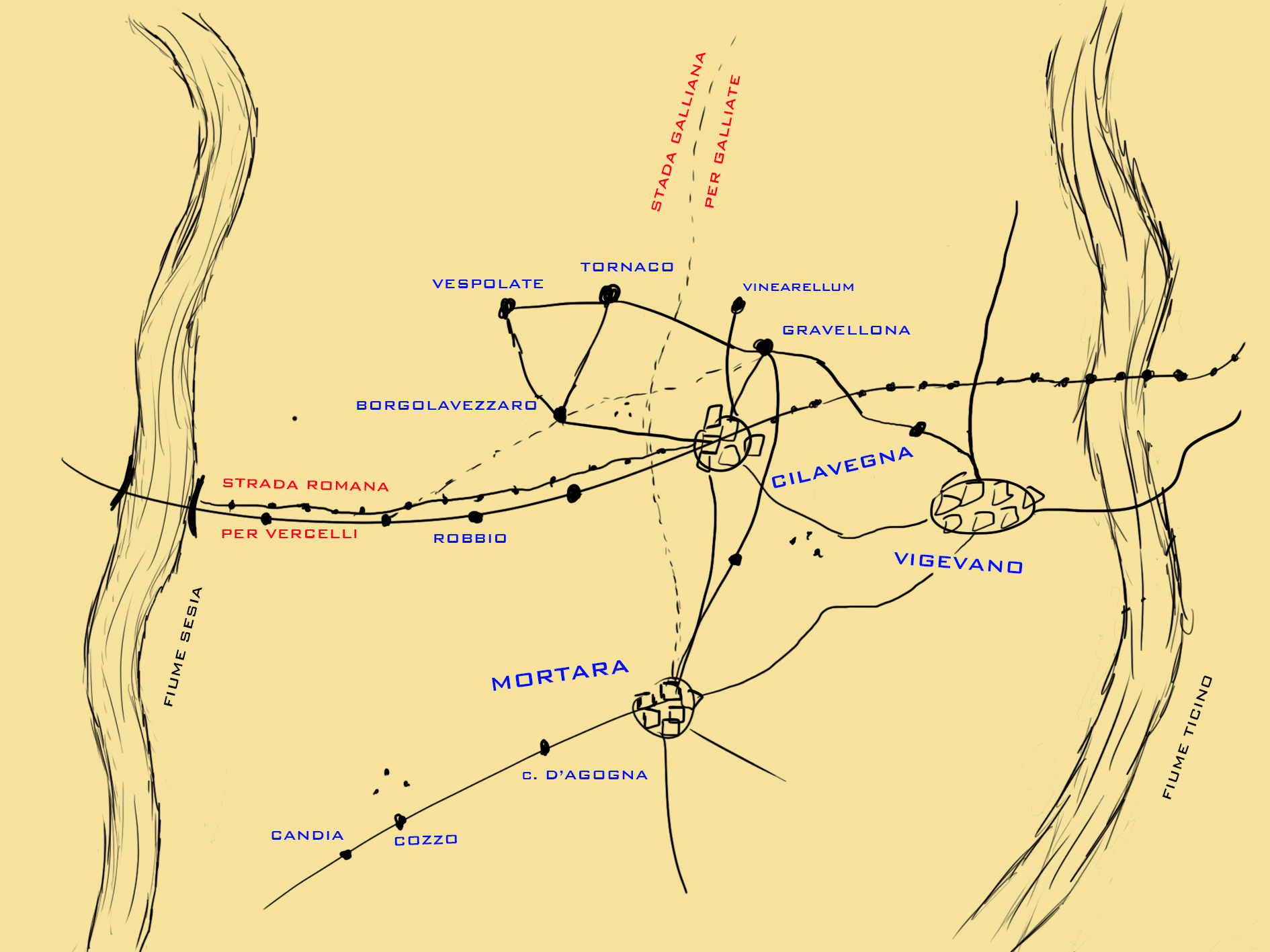
Reproduction of the map found on the concession of Berengar I

During the 6th century northern Italy was conquered by the Lombards, who named those territories Langobardia Maior with Pavia as its capital. At this stage Cilavegna became the seat of a gastald: the latter had a function of controlling the dukes, as well as exercising jurisdictional and administrative sovereignty over its territory; the office was temporary and its importance declined as ducal power grew. From this period, in addition to a few artifacts, the names of some particularly important streets have remained: via Scaldasole, for example, joins Cilavegna to the village of the same name, in which the seat of the sculdascio (from the Lombard term Schuldhess), i.e., one of the minor judges of a court (equivalent to the gastald), had been placed; another toponym dating back to the Lombard period is that of the area of Breia, near the church of Carmine: this name derives, in fact, from Brajda, which means "fund in the vicinity of the village."

Between 773 and 774 Charlemagne's descent into Italy resulted in a period of great instability for all of northern Italy. Lomellina itself was the scene of the end of the Lombard kingdom, as on October 12, 773, Charlemagne defeated the Lombard king Desiderius at Silvabella (Mortara). With the final victory of the Franks, in 774 Longobardia Maior was annexed to the transalpine kingdom, and this brought about a change in the political structure of Lomellina as well: the kingdom was reorganized on the Frankish model (counts instead of dukes) and Cilavegna, in particular, was annexed in 847 to the "Lomellino committee," part of the March of Ivrea.

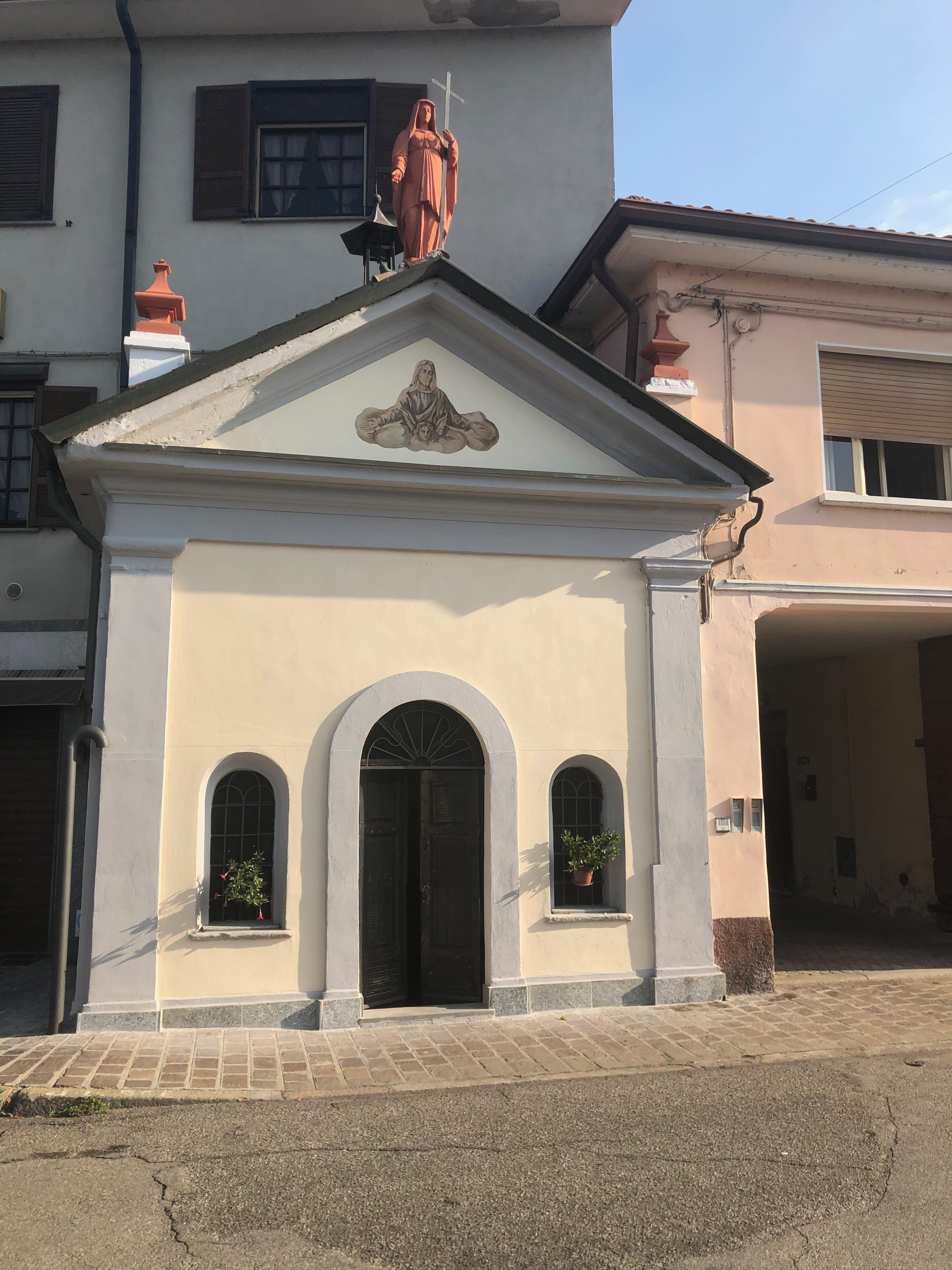
Chapel of St. Anthony

Later on, after the deposition of Charles the Fat in November 887, the territories of the Kingdom of Italy fell into the so-called "feudal anarchy" in which the first king was Berengar I; he played a very important role in the establishment of the first nucleus of the country since, as stated in a document dating back to the 10th century, he granted the bishop of Pavia to build a fortress in Cilavinnis. In fact, at that time the threat of the Hungarians was felt to be imminent, but the borders of the territories of the Kingdom of Italy were not sufficiently defended: it was then decided to fortify several areas in northern Italy. As Roberto Rampi reports in his 1965 essay Cilavegna: from its origins to the present day:

The castle must have had as its dimensions trebuchets 34 in length and 30 in width (104 x 92 meters). [...] The whole area was enclosed by a ditch 15 fathoms (9 meters) wide and 2 (1 meter) deep. [...] Entry was possible through a drawbridge, for wagons and pedestrians, and a small bridge for pedestrians only. [...] Inside were the authorities' quarters and a small group of houses for the court craftsmen.

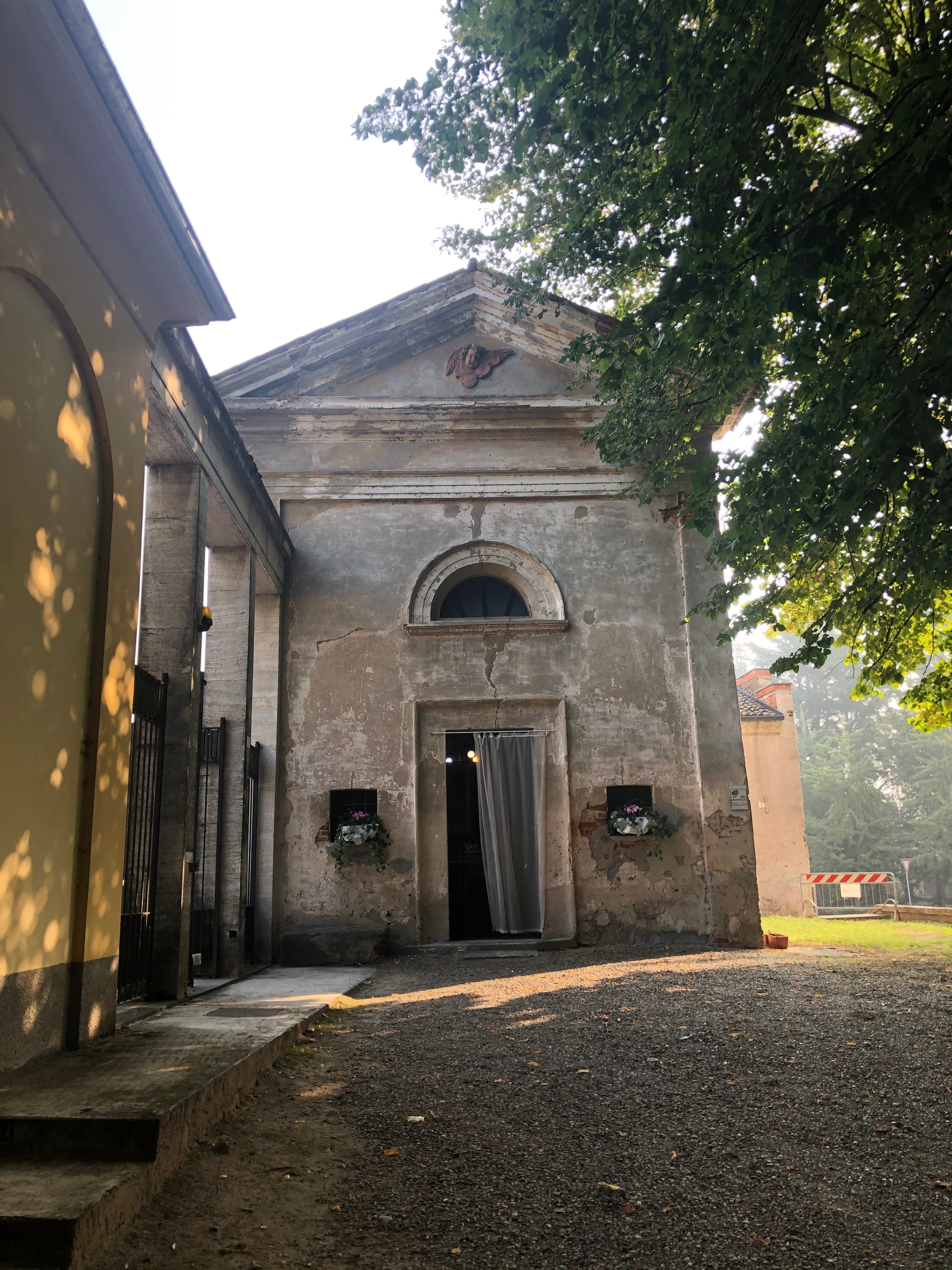
Church of St. Martin

In addition to the castle, three gates patrolled by armed guards were built at their respective town entrances; they were later named after the area occupied or the neighboring churches and are therefore remembered as "St. Martin's gate" (north of the town, near the church of St. Martin), "gate to Albonese" (southwest) and "St. Anthony's gate" (southeast, near the small church of St. Anthony). Unlike the castle, however, these buildings were not made of masonry, but were limited to wooden gates.

In such a situation of isolationism, in which each village equipped itself with walls to defend itself from possible invaders, the economy of Lomellina underwent a major decline; peasants and breeders were responsible for the sustenance of the communities, while the nobles in arms were concerned with the defense of the city borders. In addition, blacksmiths and carpenters became increasingly important to feed the encastellation industry, while trade was neglected. From a religious point of view, Cilavegna was enriched in the Romanesque period by the small church of St. Anthony; it was supposed to become an important place of worship, but over time the project was never finished and the little that had been accomplished was demolished and remodeled to a simple chapel at the end of the 18th century.

=== Late Middle Ages ===
Shield of the palatine counts of Lomello

With the reconquest (952) of ancient Ticinum by Otto I, the Kingdom of Italy became a permanent part of the Holy Roman Empire again, and this led to the increase of Pavia's influence in Lomellina: on August 8, 1164, Frederick I Barbarossa placed the committee of Lomello under the jurisdiction of Pavia, decreeing the establishment of several lordships (including Celavega) subject to it. This concession was later renewed by Henry VI (December 7, 1181) and Frederick II (August 29, 1219, November 29, 1220, May 1232). Also, during this period, the reconstruction of the parish church was initiated, which still retained the first core dating back to the 5th century. The new project consisted of a Romanesque-style church with three naves, while the materials adopted were granite and brick for the vertical parts and wood for the ceiling. It did not feature a tabernacle, which was added only in the 16th century.

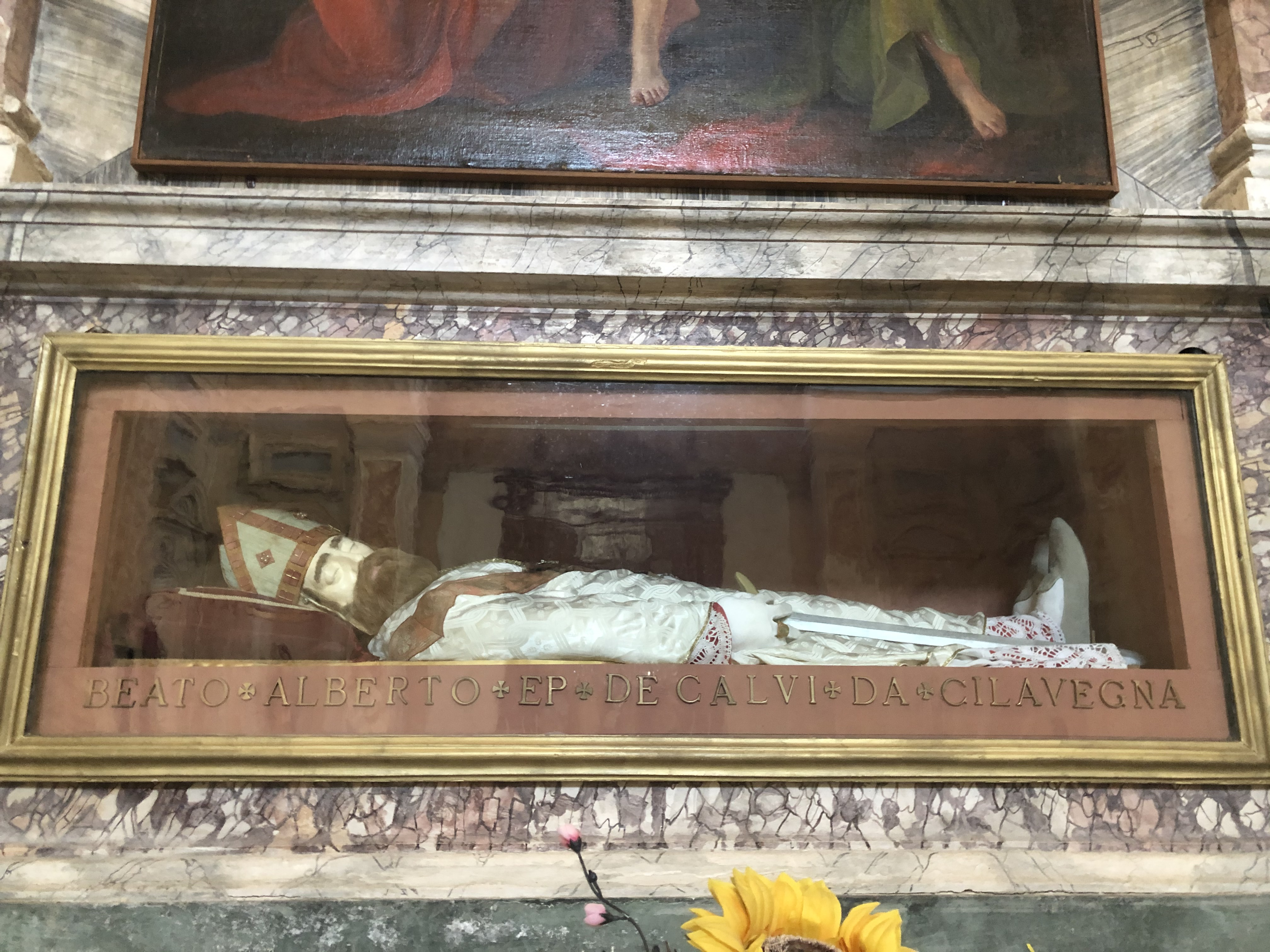
Altar of Blessed Alberto Calvi, at the church of Santa Maria

Among the illustrious births of the 12th century is that of Blessed Alberto Calvi; he was born in about 1175 and, after embarking on a religious path, became first canon of the cathedral of Novara and from 1221 bishop of Savona (though not consecrated until 1224 in Milan). In 1227 he returned to Novara because of a diatribe between Savona and Genoa, and then died around October 8, 1230. In 2012 his relics were moved inside the church of Santa Maria, where an altar that preserves them has been dedicated to him.

Cellavegna, already part since 847 of the territory of the counts of Lomello, then palatine counts (Lomellino committee), did not undergo any change administratively until the second half of the 13th century, when some noble citizens of Lomellina clashed with the feudal lords: Cilavegna came into the power of the Beccarias, and the first exponent of this family was Manfredino, invested with the title of Lord on November 8, 1290.

Later, with the conquest of Pavia by the Viscontis (1359), the fief became part of the Duchy of Milan, within the county of Pavia. The change in political order did not favor the Beccarias, who in a short time lost their possessions: Cilavegna saw the last one of that family, Castellino, in 1412, as it underwent the confiscation of the territory in favor of Maruzio Tommaso, enfeoffed on December 4, 1422, by Duke Filippo Maria Visconti. After the first decades of the 15th century, with the re-establishment of peace, there was a gradual development of agricultural production and the flourishing of various artisan activities in the village; this progress was accompanied by the building of some sacred places, such as the church of San Martino and that of Santa Maria. The former consists of a single-nave building, which can be recognized in the Romanesque style; the latter, on the other hand, was a simple little chapel, which would become important only when it was entrusted to a Dominican order.

Duchy of Milan in the 14th century

At the same time, different lords followed one another in the village: after not even twenty years, the fief was ceded to Francesco di Castelbarco (July 21, 1441), prince of Marignano and descendant of the Lodrone counts, but the latter did not keep it for long because on March 5, 1466, Cilavegna passed to Alberico Maletta. Again, as was the case with Maruzio Tommaso, this was not a nobleman by birth, but a man enriched by the acquisition of several fiefs and who, thanks to the wealth he accumulated, became a count palatine.

The last feudal lord of the medieval era was Vercellino Visconti, who acquired those lands on July 2, 1483. His power, however, did not last long as, after Ludovico il Moro took possession of the Duchy of Milan in 1494, the latter wished to favor his trustees at the expense of the rights acquired by others and therefore handed Cilavegna over to his steward, Giacometto della Tela, on February 6, 1496.

In the latter period the town acquired more and more importance in the religious sphere, which is why in 1492 an additional parish was established: a Dominican community, in fact, built in the area of the "prato dell'Olmo" its own convent. The Dominicans answered to the Vigevano order of the preaching friars of Saint Peter Martyr, but for a long time they enjoyed a certain autonomy since it was not until 1568, at the behest of Pope Pius V, that their community was incorporated into the convent of Vigevano, thus becoming to all intents and purposes a vicariate of it.

The end of the medieval era was marked by a difficult economic situation, marked by the heavy taxation imposed by the Sforza domination (especially with Ludovico il Moro), which led to the emigration of struggling peasants and artisans, who were often forced to sell their properties. Agriculture was also marked by such events, as there was a slow disintegration of the property of small peasants in favor of large landowners; these, however, were spokesmen for the agricultural innovations of the period since, as early as the end of the 15th century, the first rice crops were started (in 1480 there was the first attempt at rice cultivation at Villanova di Cassolo).

== Modern Age ==
=== Lordship of the Atellani ===
Giacometto della Tela
Annibale della Tela	Carlo della Tela
Annibale della Tela	Carlo della Tela sp. Barbara Stampa
Ottavio della Tela
Barbara della Tela m. Carlo Taverna

Family tree of the Atellani

With Giacometto della Tela the Atellan lordship was inaugurated, a family originally from Voghera and not noble, whose members had only the title of knight. Their hegemony was interrupted when, due to the war of succession for the Duchy of Milan, it passed to Louis XII of France, who reinstated Vercellino Visconti on November 12, 1500.

In 1498, in fact, the king of France asserted his claims to the Lombard duchy because one of his ancestors, Louis of Orleans, had married Valentina Visconti in 1389, and the marriage contract stipulated that the title of duke of Milan would go to Valentina's descendants. This explains, therefore, the reason for the clash, which also took place in the neighboring territory of Cilavegna: in 1500 Louis XII besieged the town of Mortara, in which Ludovico il Moro had taken refuge, who, abandoned by the troops, was later taken prisoner. French control persisted, with a small interruption between 1512 and 1515, until 1525, when Francesco II Sforza obtained dominion over those lands. This event changed the political order of Lomellina because on February 2, 1532, with the birth of the committee of Vigevano, several towns were annexed to the latter, often at the expense of the county of Pavia: one of these was Cilavegna, which also saw the return of the Atellani on December 9, 1534. The new lordship, as a result of the concession of Francesco II Sforza to Carlo della Tela, experienced an early flourishing period, characterized by large expenditures in favor of the population and changes in town planning; in the early 16th century the reconstruction of the church of San Rocco, where the confraternity of the saint of the same name had its headquarters, was begun. The congregation retained ownership until 1687, when it ceded it to the municipality (at first becoming a cemetery). Other urbanistic changes were made to the castle, which was adapted as a dwelling where guests could entertain and hold parties; a consequence of this work was a surplus of bricks such that some buildings in the village could be repaired. Then, in the late 1500s, the church of San Cristoforo was built, the seat of the confraternity of Mercede and the Holy Trinity.

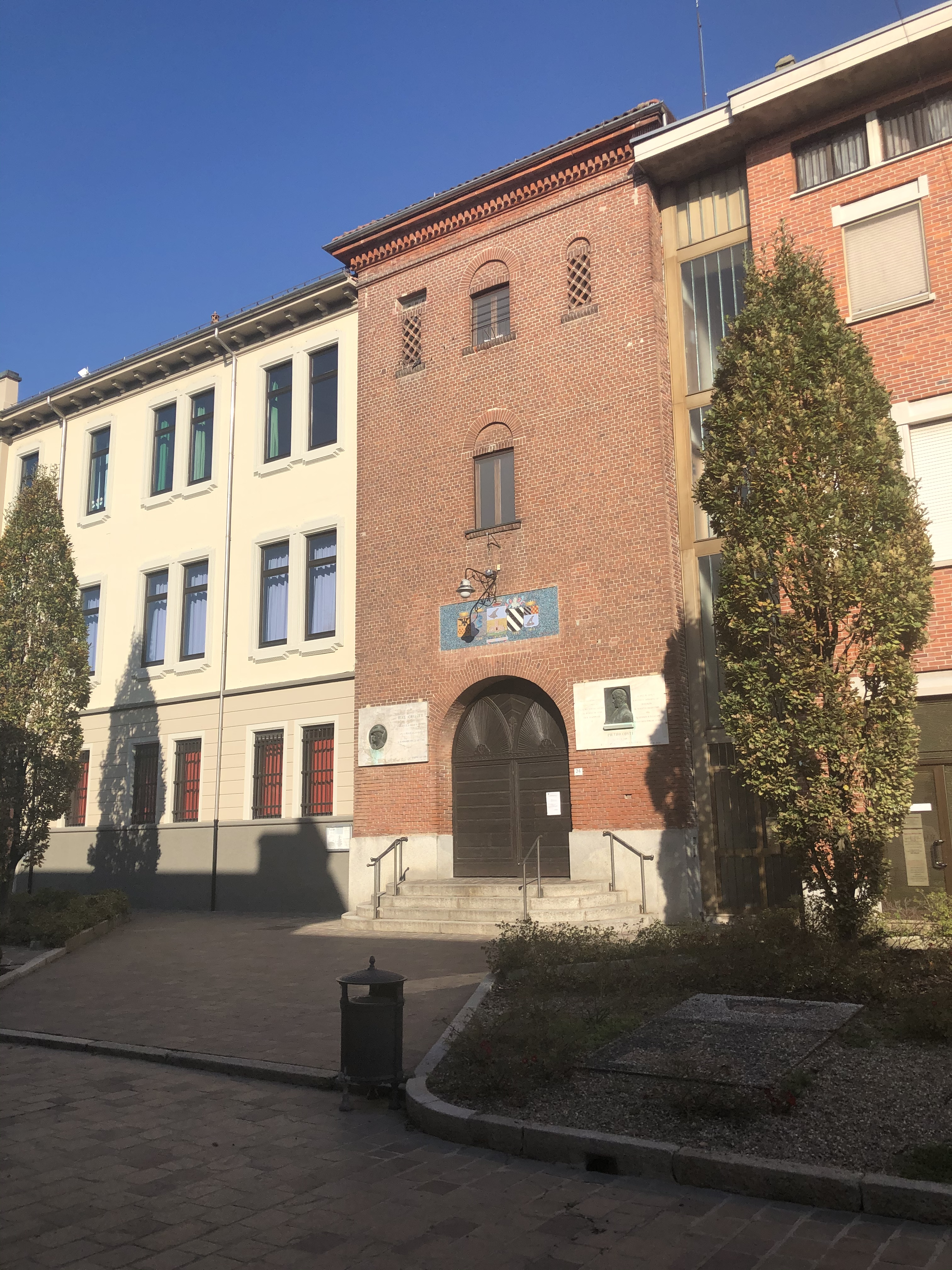
Old castle keep and entrance to the elementary school courtyard

As far as reforms were concerned, a very thorny issue within the community was settled in 1577: the poor, in fact, complained of exclusion from the town council and, above all, of strong rivalry with the rich for access to the large communal woods; to resolve these complaints, by concession of Philip II, King of Spain and Duke of Milan, the wooded areas were opened to all, but with the condition that wood be transported only by hand or on one's own shoulders, without resorting to carts. In this way, the amount of wood per capita (regulated by the trivial individual physical limits) was reduced, and internal relations within the country returned to being peaceful. The economy also enjoyed a certain regrowth, and in particular sectors that had previously been neglected to fuel the policy of isolationism flourished.

The happy phase of the Atellan lordship, however, did not last long as the feudal lords became indebted to the community and it was necessary to impose a cap on the price of bread: this triggered discontent in the village and the bakers began to sell their production under the counter. The Atellani thus received a writ of summons, to which, however, they did not respond, and the trial was held in contumacy of the feudal lord; as a result of the proceedings Carlo della Tela was found guilty and thus had to abandon the feud, leaving it to his son Ottavio in 1591.

The new feudal lord, in order to curry favor with the people of Cilavegna, included among the councilors those who owed money to the municipality, but this decision caused discontent to grow, and in 1592 the King of Spain himself, Philip II, reconstituted the original municipal council. The situation seemed to have returned to normal, but in 1594 it was discovered that Ottavio della Tela was paying the podestà more than he should have been to cover up the frauds he had perpetrated against the community: the clash with the inhabitants was inevitable. From that time on, Octavius could only wear the role of lord formally because the community was often reluctant to rely on him; the only work done during this period was the repair of the Vigevano-Cilavegna road. He nevertheless retained control of the territories until his death on March 20, 1615, and his passing marked the end of the Atellan lordship, since the only remaining heir was his daughter Barbara, who, however, had no right of succession as a woman.

=== Lordship of the Tavernas ===
The Taverna family

Coat of arms of the Taverna Counts

Although originally from Nizza Monferrato, the Taverna counts were not unknown within the territory of Lomellina: some, in fact, had already lived in Cilavegna for a long time, especially Cesare after his marriage to Barbara della Tela, and others owned several fiefs throughout the Vigevanesco; these riches, moreover, allowed them to occupy important roles before and during the Duchy of Milan: some assumed the title of count palatine and, in the specific case of Francesco Taverna, supreme chancellor of Imperial Highness of the Holy Roman Empire.

After the death of Ottavio della Tela, the fief was managed by various podestà of the Regia Camera while waiting for someone to purchase those lands: among the various competitors, Count Cesare Taverna, husband of Barbara della Tela, prevailed and became the owner and lord of Cilavegna on October 2, 1636. Thus was established the Taverna lordship, which had to immediately remedy an internal crisis that had already begun: for many years, in fact, the town had been fighting with the fledgling municipality of Parona for possession of the ancient fresco of St. Anne. That work, attributed to the school of Gaudenzio Ferrari, was previously kept in a small votive chapel in the Cilavegnese countryside, but faced with the claims of the Parona people there was a clash between the two municipalities. The solution was the construction of a small church to protect the portrait; the building was the first small church of Sant'Anna, then called Gesiolo della Calderlina.

The other issues that arose during that period involved the siege in 1630 of the town of Mortara, which was attacked by French troops. The armies caused much damage to the buildings of Cilavegna, but the most serious event was the burning of the archives, as a result of which many of the fief's documents were lost. In addition to this, a violent wave of plague struck the whole of Lomellina, decimating the population and compromising the local economy; production slowed considerably and the flour famine was remedied with mixed millet and bran doughs.

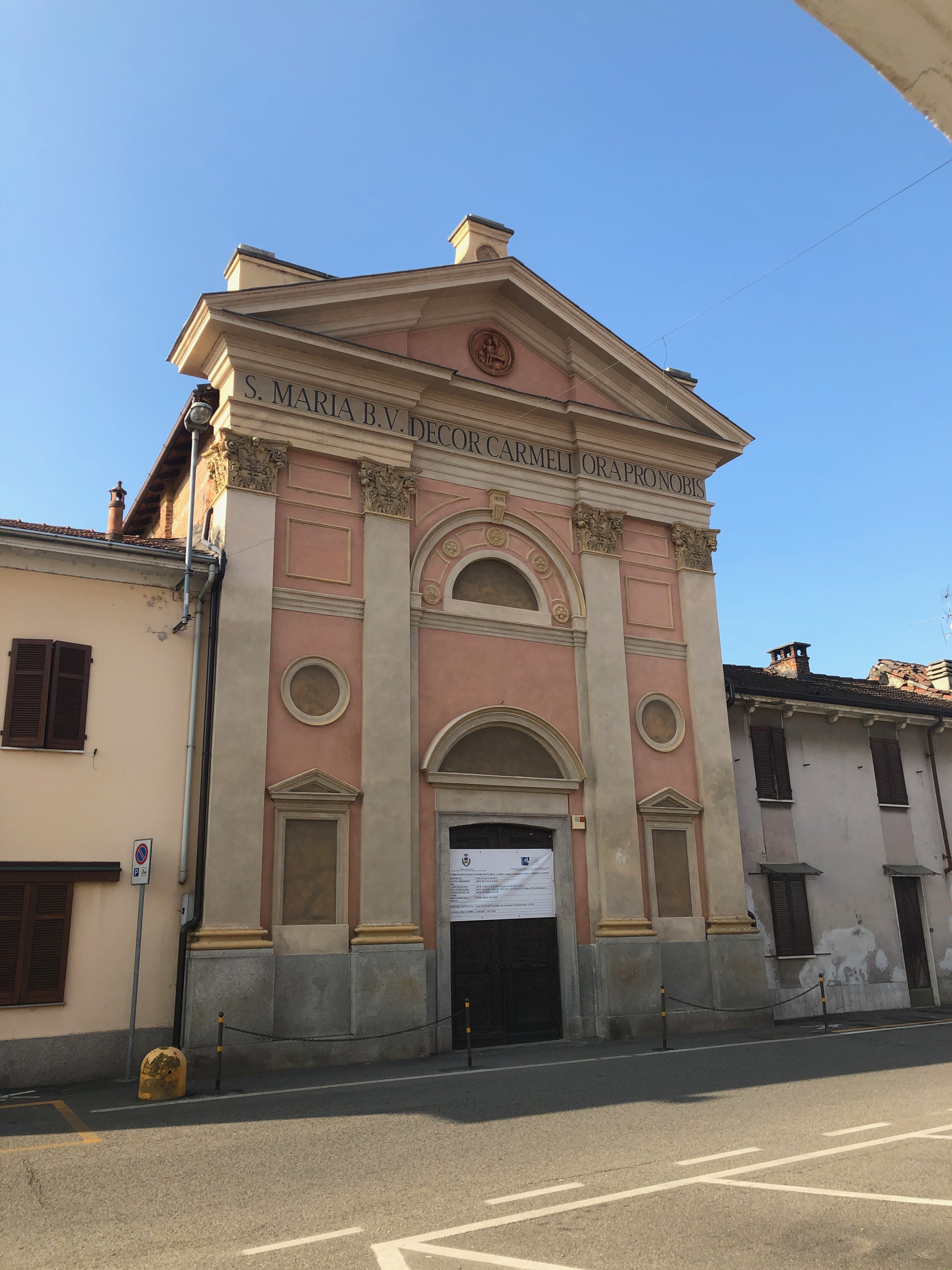
Church of Carmel

Cesare Taverna's attitude toward these difficulties did not benefit the fiefdom as he focused more on expanding his holdings and open issues remained unresolved. The crisis caused by the various Monferrato wars led to the indebtedness of most of the community and the situation showed no signs of improvement. Cesare Taverna's death in 1639 definitively marked the least prosperous moment because his successor, his son Lodovico, was too young to manage a fiefdom and was therefore temporarily replaced by Countess Barbara della Tela. During this period the construction of the church of the Blessed Virgin of the Rosary was begun (1640), and in 1660 it became the seat of the confraternity of the Holy Rosary. Along with the religious building the convent was enlarged (1680) in order to adapt it to the increase in the number of friars and priests present. Already from the beginning of the 17th century, there was also the church of the Blessed Virgin of Mount Carmel in Cilavegna, also the seat of a confraternity, that of the devotees of Our Lady of Mount Carmel.

Later, partly due to the damage caused by the soldiers of the garrison of Mortara (1659), the economic situation of the Taverna family worsened considerably, which prevented Lodovico from completing the payment of the purchase sum of the fief: his estates were then confiscated and the count had to abandon Cilavegna until his death (1679). He was succeeded by his son Cesare, known as Iuniore, who, protected in the first stage by his grandmother Barbara della Tela, took care of covering the debts of his predecessors. At that point the fief returned to the hands of the Tavernas. Cesare Iuniore died without an heir in 1687, and the fief passed to his uncle Lorenzo after he married his niece Claudia. Underscoring the internal crisis that was taking place was a note from the vicar general of Pavia, who wrote a letter for the shrine of Sant'Anna to be demolished; it was in fact, due to the state of neglect in the area, continually marked by theft and desecration. The order, however, was not carried out because the installation of a hermit to care for the area meant greater security for the sacred furnishings and the structure.

Under Lorenzo Taverna, however, the general mood was smoother and this allowed the implementation of a gradual arrangement of the village buildings: the repair of the castle was initiated, with restoration of the tower (in 1694 the now-lost coats of arms of the sovereign were refurbished) and of the entrance arch (the coats of arms of the feudal lord were frescoed); in addition, from 1696 to 1713 the drawbridges leading to the castle were arranged. Religiously, too, there were innovations as the first feast of St. Anne was celebrated on July 26, 1719, an annual occasion celebrating the agricultural life of the town; it was initially characterized by a sung mass and with blessing of the fields, while in the evening there was an explosion of firecrackers.

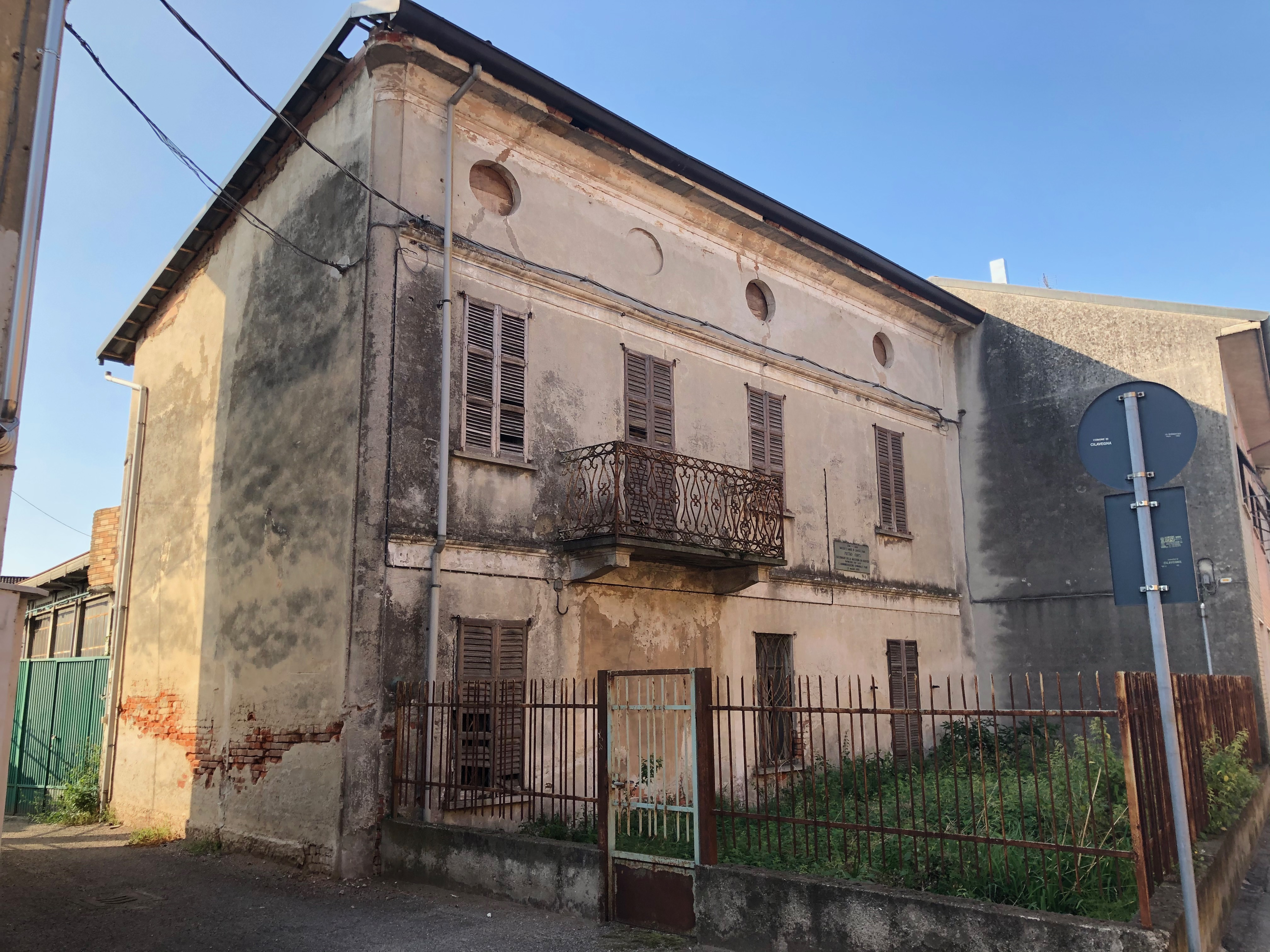
House in which Pietro Conti lived from 1796 to 1856

When Lorenzo Taverna died (1719), the fief passed to Costanzo Taverna (1722), his son. He was lord during the expansion of the parish church, which from 1729 saw a new structure consisting of a large nave enclosed by six side chapels and the large square chancel crowned by the semicircular apse. Then, in 1733, came his son Lorenzo, who had to face the difficult period marked by the war for the succession of Austria (1740-1748); it had consequences on the lifestyle of the population, but above all on the political order of Vigevanasco, since with the Treaty of Aachen (1748) it became a Savoy territory under Charles Emmanuel III, together with the Vogherese and Alto Novarese. From this time a process of economic growth took place in the fief, marked by the assignment of the title of highways to the Cilavegna-Gravellona-Cassolo, Cilavegna-Vigevano and the Cilavegna-Vercelli; thus a number of improvement projects were initiated, fostering trade for all of Lomellina and Vigevanasco. At the same time, it was proposed to unite the Sesia River with the Ticino River by a system of navigable canals, but this project was not implemented until the 19th century.

In 1794 Lorenzo Taverna died, and he was succeeded first by his eldest son Costanzo and shortly after by his youngest son Giacomo. The latter witnessed the exploits of Napoleon Bonaparte, who led the Italian campaign from 1796, which was followed by the signing of the Treaty of Campo Formio (October 1797). With that document the existence of the Cisalpine Republic (including Lombardy) was recognized and feudal rights in Italy were annulled: (Note: Excerpt from the records of the Executive Directorate, session of 9 Thermidor V.) the Taverna Counts lost all privileges by an edict issued on July 20, 1798. (Note: Antonio and Carlo Taverna tried to manage the fief, but since they were no longer in de facto leadership their authority was not recognized by the population.) After Napoleon's conquest, some of the historic confraternities were merged, and because of this, the Confraternity of the Blessed Sacrament was born, that is, the union of the confraternity at the Church of the Carmel with those of Saints Roch and Christopher.

Subsequently, with the Congress of Vienna (1814-1815) Austria obtained Lombardy, which was incorporated into the Kingdom of Lombardy-Venetia, and the Austro-Russian troops of General Suvorov were allowed to subject the inhabitants to continuous harassment and humiliation, which had already been implemented well before the annexation to Austria: on October 28, 1799, for example, a corporal and two soldiers of the Hunter Corps arrived in Cilavegna; they were looking for two carters requested by the Vigevano command, but, not finding them, they struck the daughter of one of them with a saber and humiliated some of the town councilors, leaving them in the mud and arresting one of them for no reason.

Cesare Taverna - sp. Barbara della Tela
Lodovico Taverna
Cesare "Iuniore" Taverna
Claudia Taverna - m. Lorenzo Taverna
Matteo Taverna
Francesco Taverna
Luigi Taverna
Lorenzo Taverna - sp. Claudia Taverna
Cesare Taverna
Costanzo Taverna - sp. M.Teresa March. C. Visconti
Cesare Taverna
Carlo Taverna
Barbara Taverna
Camilla Taverna
Lorenzo Taverna - sp. M.Anna. March. C. Lonati Visconti
Costanzo Taverna
Filippo Taverna
Cesare Taverna
Francesco Taverna
Antonio Taverna
Barbara Taverna
Giuseppe Taverna
Teresa Taverna
Giacomo Taverna - sp. M.Anna Nob. Vitali
Antonio Taverna
Costanzo Taverna
Paola Taverna
Carlo Taverna
C. Maria Taverna
Ignazio Taverna
Stan. Taverna
Camilla Taverna
Isabella Taverna
Maria Taverna
Clara Taverna
Matteo Taverna
Barbara Taverna
Giovanni Taverna
Antonia Taverna
Livia Taverna
Margherita Taverna

== Contemporary age ==
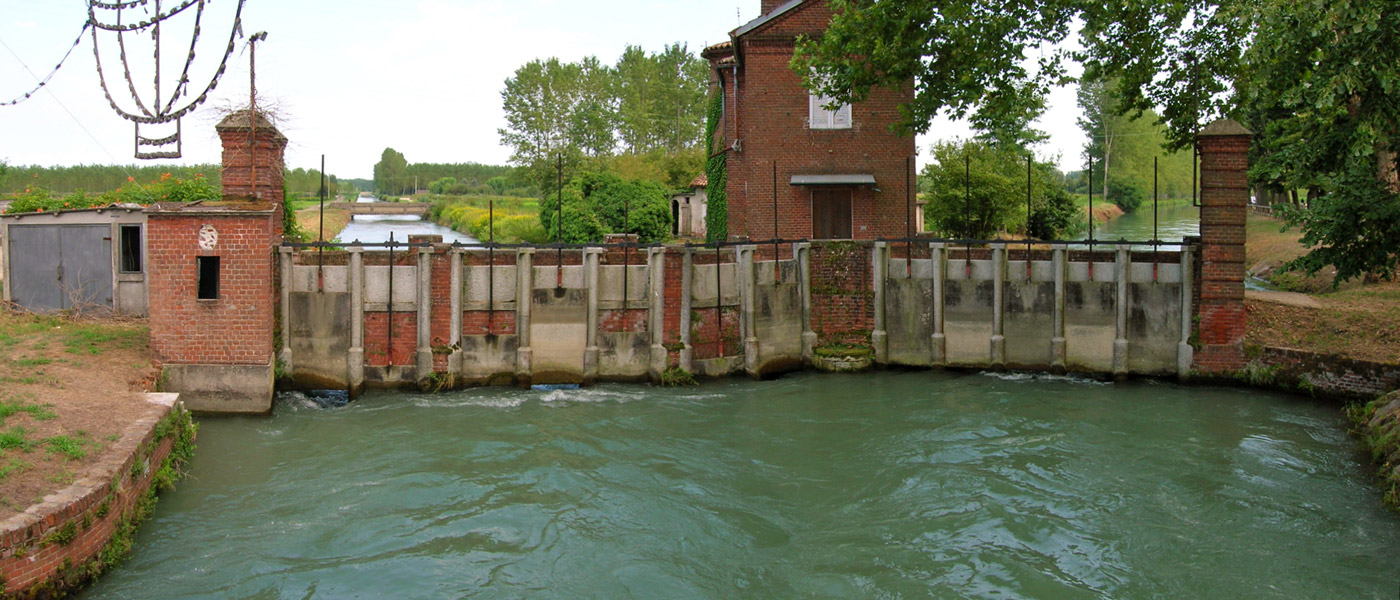
Quintino Sella Canal, a branch of the Cavour Canal, passing near the Sanctuary of Sant'Anna

=== The works of the early 19th century ===
During the new Austrian rule, the municipality of Cilavegna became active with several public works: first of all was the contract (1808) for the construction of the cemetery near the church of San Martino; until then, in fact, the village did not have a proper place for burials, but had mass graves and a small center near the parish church. The new structure was designed to accommodate many corpses and was therefore built in a "monumental" style; in the following years there were further works that increased the number of burial chapels. Also, in 1810, the town hall was moved to the then disused church of San Rocco, and then it was placed in the old castle grounds (Dec. 28, 1900), which was ceded to the municipality at the behest of the last Taverna heirs.

Other interventions concerned some useful ordinances to prevent internal hostilities within the community; in particular, in 1812 it was sanctioned that on feast days hawkers could not occupy the spaces used for selling from the first stroke of the bell until vespers, while the innkeepers had to let out their customers during this interval.

Subsequently, in 1815, the construction of a jail inside the municipal building was initiated by His Majesty's order, which in turn was protected by the arms delivered to the mayor, law enforcement officers, secretaries and provost. In 1816 the raising of the bell tower and the re-foundation and increase in the weight of the bells were considered, while 1817 closed with the prohibition of the "black exchange," that is, a decree that sanctioned the prohibition of the production of rye, lemon balm and mixed bread for the purpose of selling it illegally. In 1818 Lomellina, and with it Cilavegna, was reunited with the Vigevanasco territories, and in the same year the teaching of Latin by the parish priest and vice-parish priest was also introduced into the town's educational system.

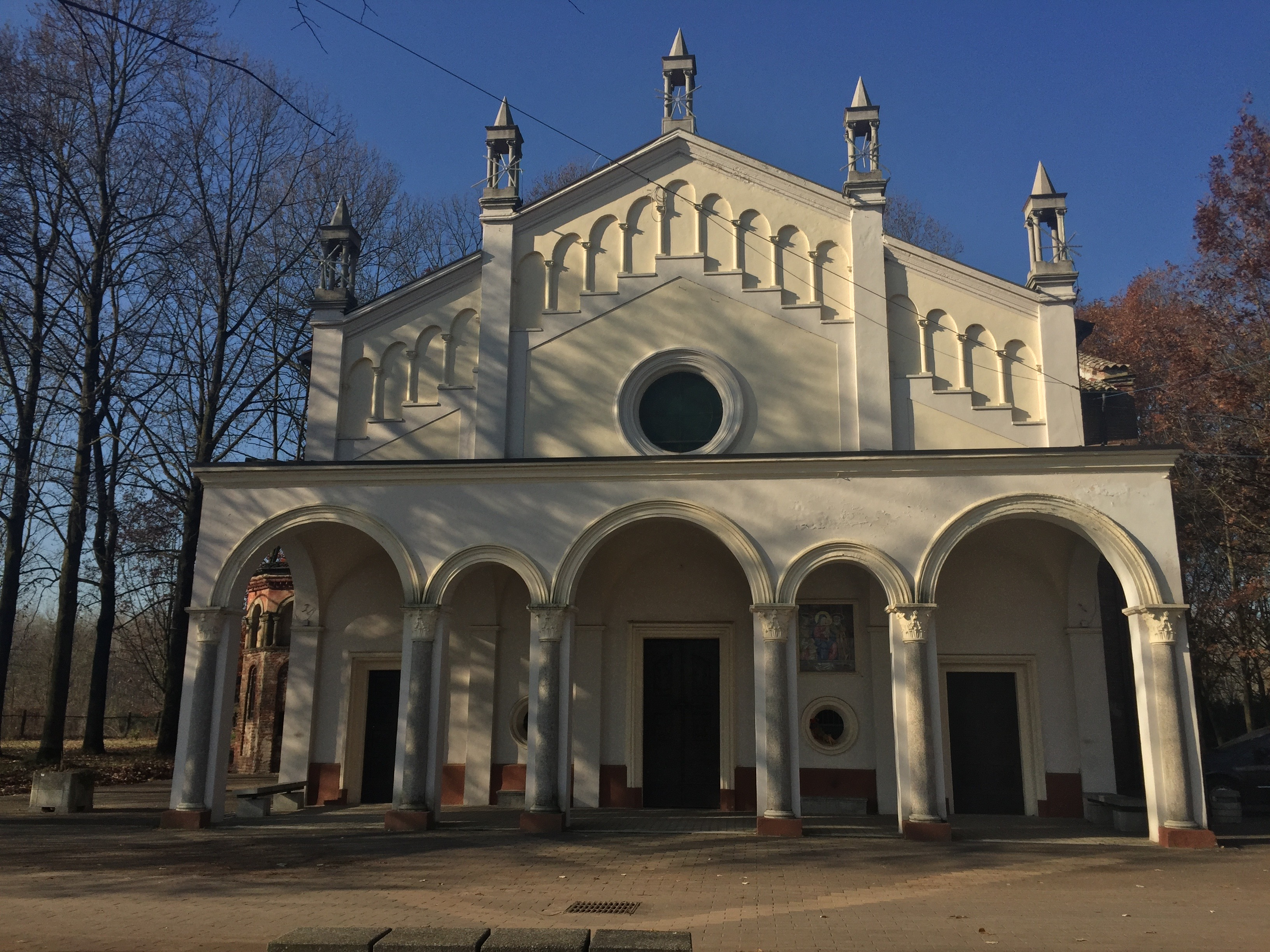
Sanctuary of St. Anne

=== Economic development ===
During the early 1800s, the economic structure of the town began to change: several companies were founded and in parallel there was an increase in population, which resulted in the construction of new housing; this led to the need for detailed mapping of the urban road network (7 municipal roads were counted), resulting in its paving; the public weighbridge was also placed in what is now Garibaldi Square, where it remained until 1927, when it was moved in front of the church of Santa Maria.

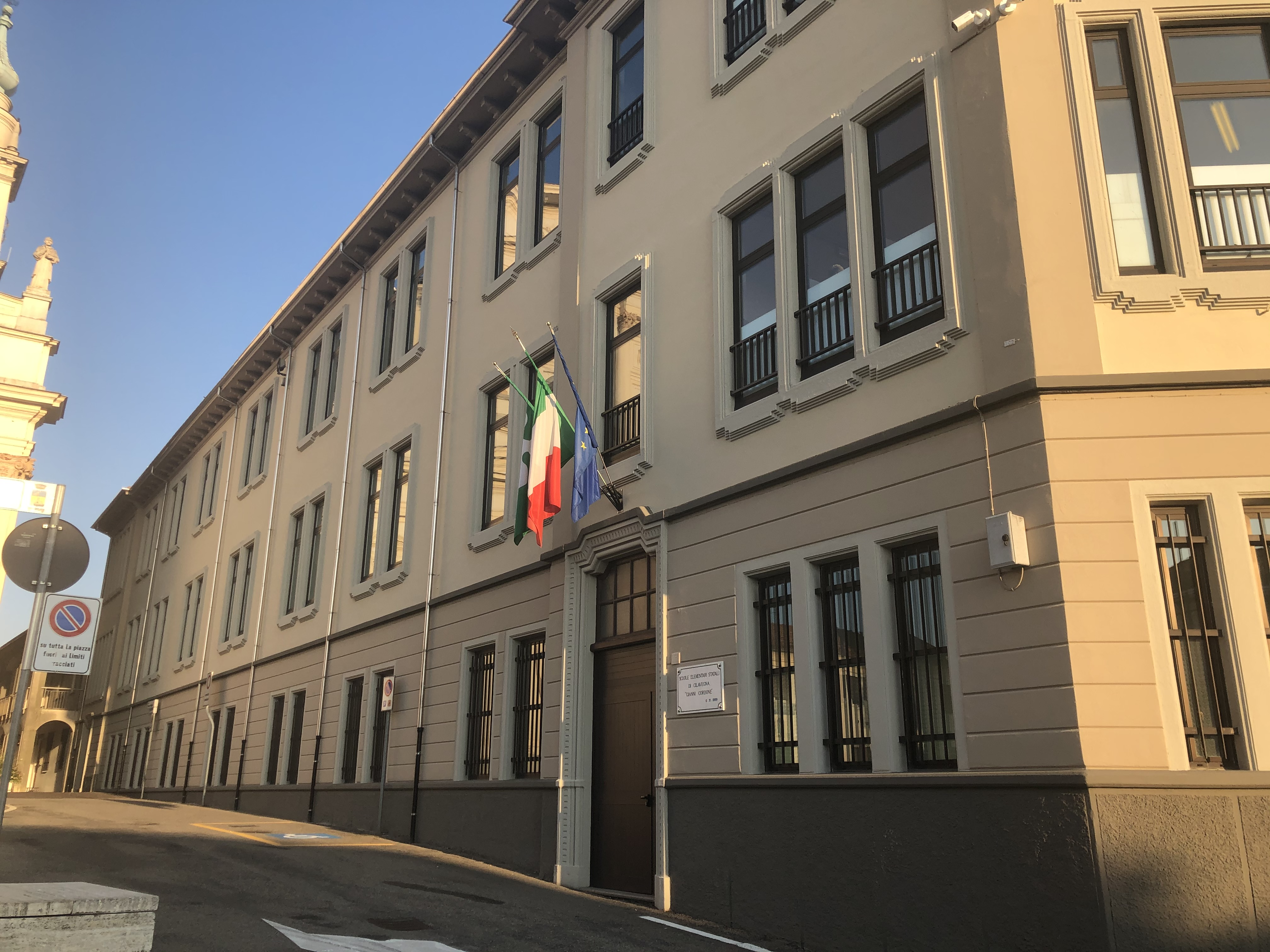
The elementary school of Cilavegna

Subsequently, in 1844/45 a request was made for the possibility of opening two weekly markets, one every Tuesday for wheat, rice and livestock and an annual one for silk cocoons; the request was accepted on the condition that the predetermined day was Thursday, so that the market would not coincide with the one in Gravellona: the first day of the fair was April 16, 1846.

In 1849 Cilavegna witnessed the episodes of the Battle of Novara, an event of the First Italian War of Independence; ten years later, with the Second Italian War of Independence, Lombardy was annexed by the Kingdom of Sardinia and Lomellina became part of the province of Pavia (1859). With the birth of the Kingdom of Italy, a number of town-planning projects were initiated in Cilavegna, such as the construction of the Cavour canal (1871) and the installation, at the end of the century, of 10 oil lanterns for night lighting. Also during this period, the facade of the Sant'Anna shrine was renovated (1889), after the building had risked being torn down for the excavation of the Quintino Sella canal (a branch of the Cavour canal).

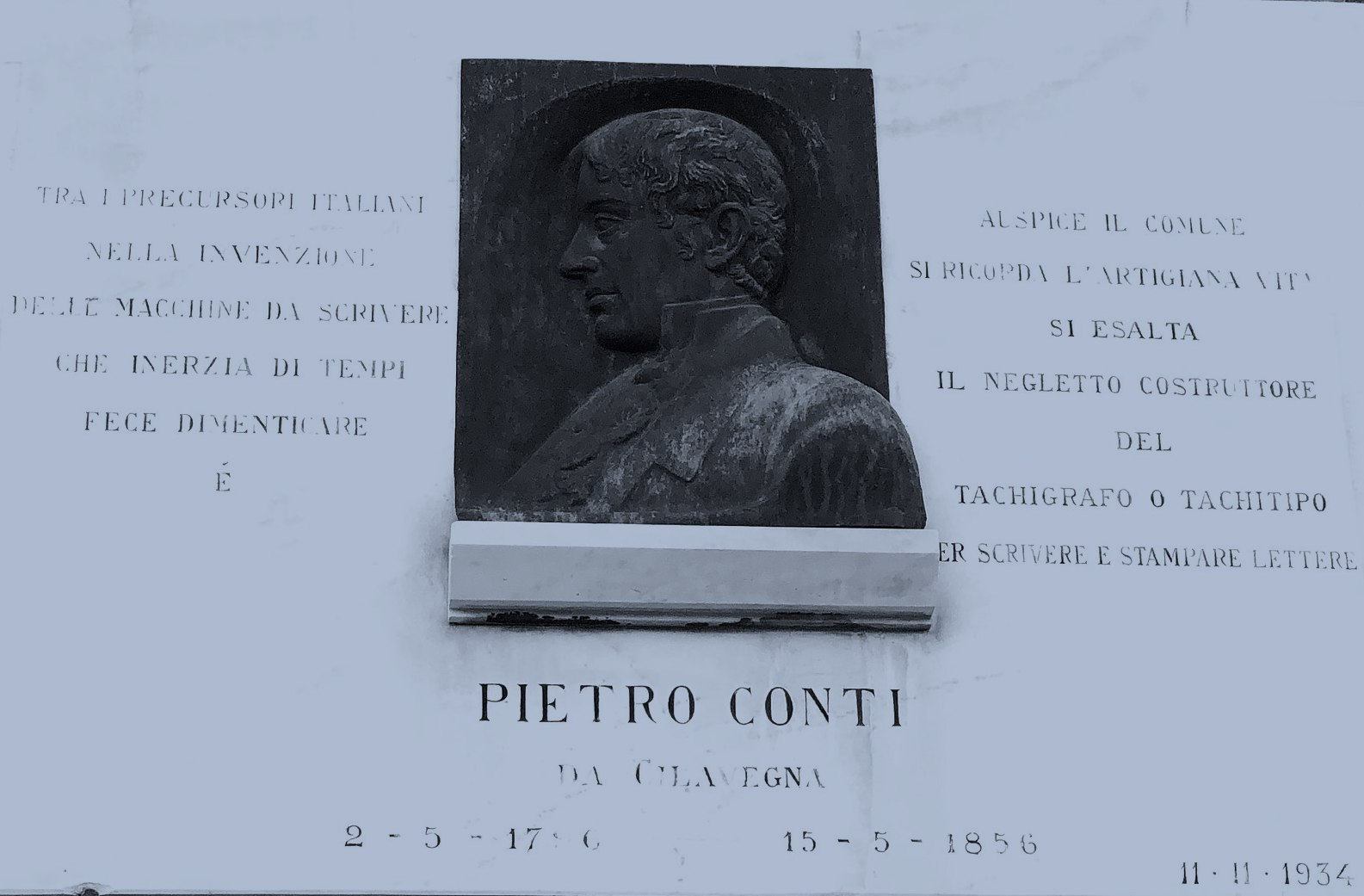
Plaque, fixed in 1934 on the tower of the ancient castle, celebrating inventor Pietro Conti

Between the end of the 19th century and the beginning of the 20th century, the town's industrial hub developed: the foundation stone was that of the company founded in 1888 by Pietro Gallo; before officially becoming "Manifattura Gallo" (1907), the company counted a few looms, which, however, were driven by the power generated only by the hydraulic turbines placed in the Quintino Sella canal; later, it took the name "Manifattura Rondo S.p.A." (1943). Another company was the "Groppi Distillery," founded in 1876 by Pietro Groppi and Rosa Bertani and became famous in some countries of the world for Groppi Soda. Later (1929), the Giudice (Ca.Gi.) hosiery was founded. Because of the flourishing of new activities in both crafts and industry (about 1,600 work units), the municipality had to open new schools to accommodate the population and economic growth of the town: first there was the annual agricultural preparatory school (1920), while in 1929 the construction of a 12-room elementary school was started inside the northwest wing of the former castle (inaugurated in October 1931 and awarded a gold medal on May 17, 1932); the first building then became an agricultural vocational preparatory course in 1929 and finally a middle school in 1963. As for the services offered by the municipality, in 1912 authorization was granted for the Mortara-Cassolo tramway line, which was never built because of unsuitable roads, and on May 21, 1919, the Mortara-Vigevano automobile service was built, replacing the horse-drawn stagecoach; in addition, in 1927 the telephone system was installed and the new municipal sports field opened. Shortly before, the first oratory in Cilavegna was also inaugurated (1922), later replaced by the "Celestina Falzoni" kindergarten: it was run by a group of missionary nuns of the Immaculate Regina Pacis, sent by Father Pianzola to devote themselves to the training of young girls (for this reason the oratory was only for girls); in 1939 followed the opening of the male oratory (at that time "oratory of S. Luigi," later "Carlo Felice Tappa"), which occupied the courtyard next to the parish church (former church of San Rocco).

=== The two world wars ===
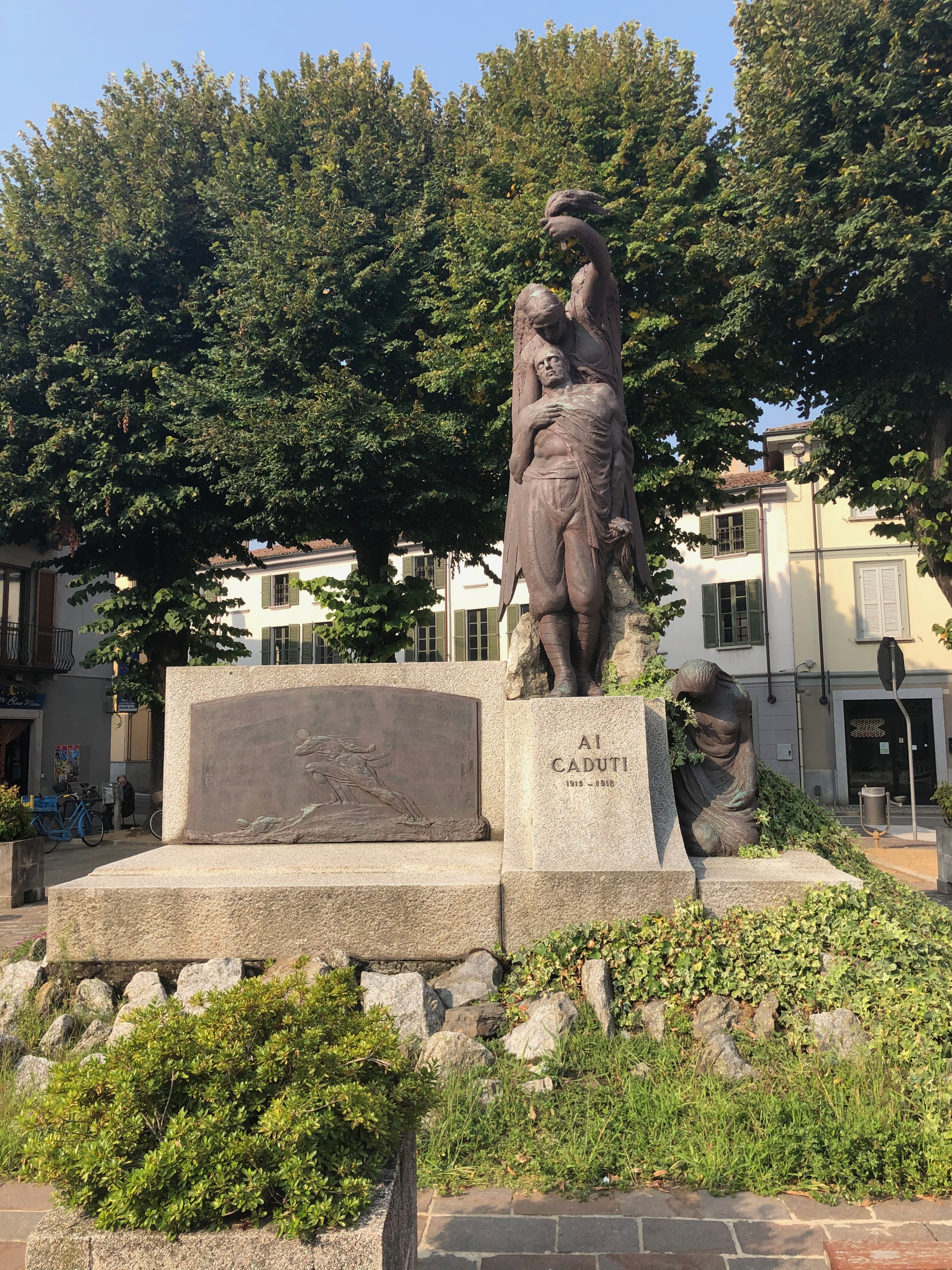
Monument to the fallen in World War I

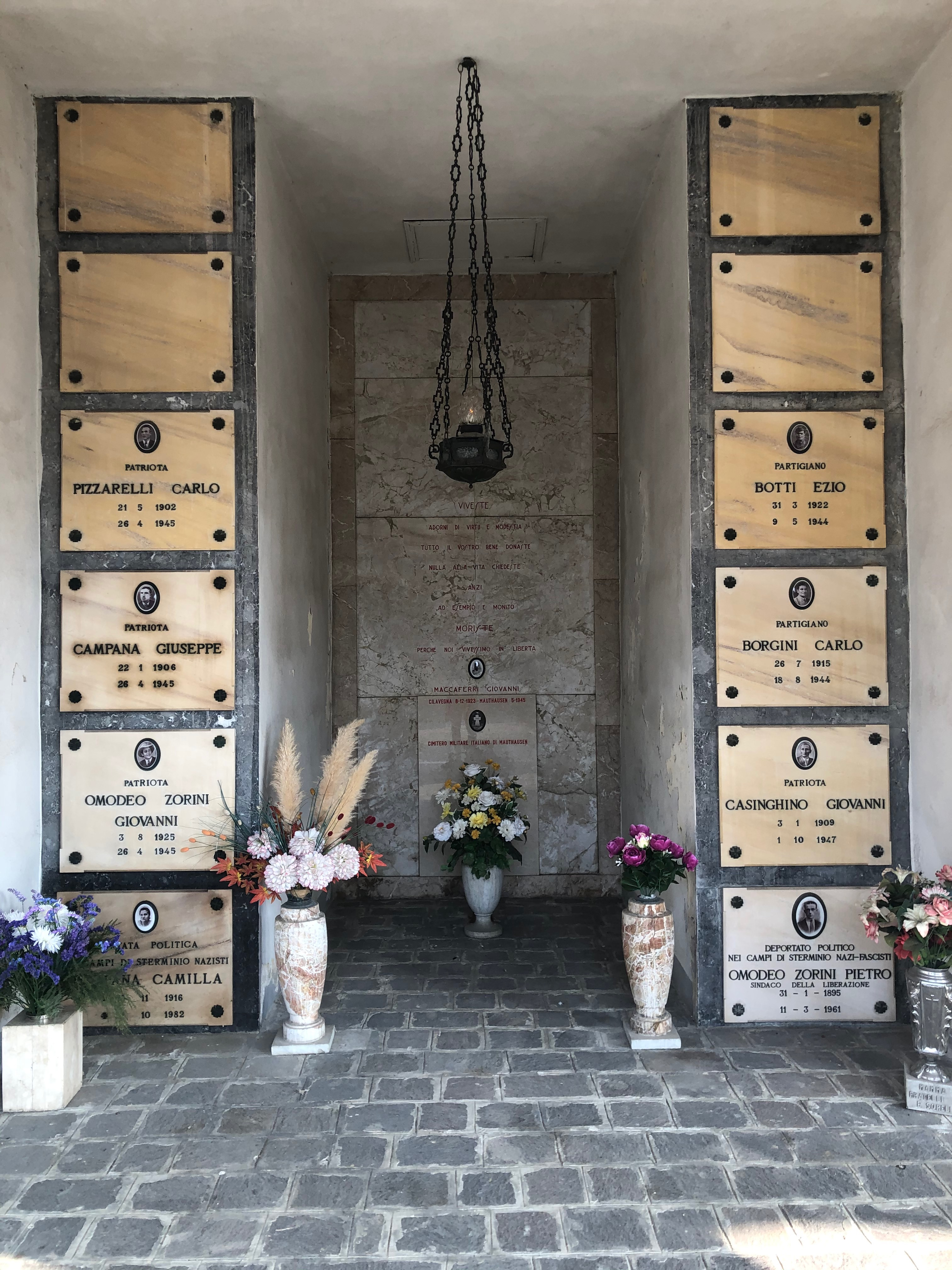
Tomb in honor of World War II patriots

The experience of World War I left memories through the monuments dedicated to the fallen; in fact, they were honored with an altar, on which are the names of all the people of Cilavegna who lost their lives in combat. Together with the tombstones of World War II patriots, the one honoring the victims of World War I represents an important place of commemoration of the twentieth-century war period. With the advent of the twenty-year fascist period, the town underwent some changes regarding public and private administration: in 1923, in fact, under the fascist laws, Dr. Giudice Romualdo was appointed mayor and the "Club Concordia," an apolitical-recreational association, founded in 1910, was closed, which was at odds with the Mussolinian directive precisely because of its natural estrangement from politics. From this period, however, one is reminded of the new urban structure assumed by the city, as it was used as a German garrison, which had a storehouse of provisions in the elementary schools and a prison camp at a building of the "Rondo" manufactory, which was forced into the practice of the black bag in order to make up for the reduction in work space; the former church of San Rocco, moreover, became the "Casa del Fascio." During the same period, however, a Cilavegnese liberation committee was formed, which secretly tried to fight the fascist regime; the most exemplary episodes of that group were the strike of March 2, 1944, and the clashes of April 25, 1945: the former was called by the Liberation Committee for Northern Italy and saw several workers of the Ca.Gi. protesting in front of the factories (for which some were deported to the concentration camps of Mauthausen and Auschwitz); the second, on the other hand, was the last gesture by some patriots, named Giuseppe Campana, Giovanni Omodeo Zorini and Carlo Pizzarelli, who on liberation day decided to confront the remaining German soldiers, dying from the armed response of the enemies.

=== From the post-war period to the present ===
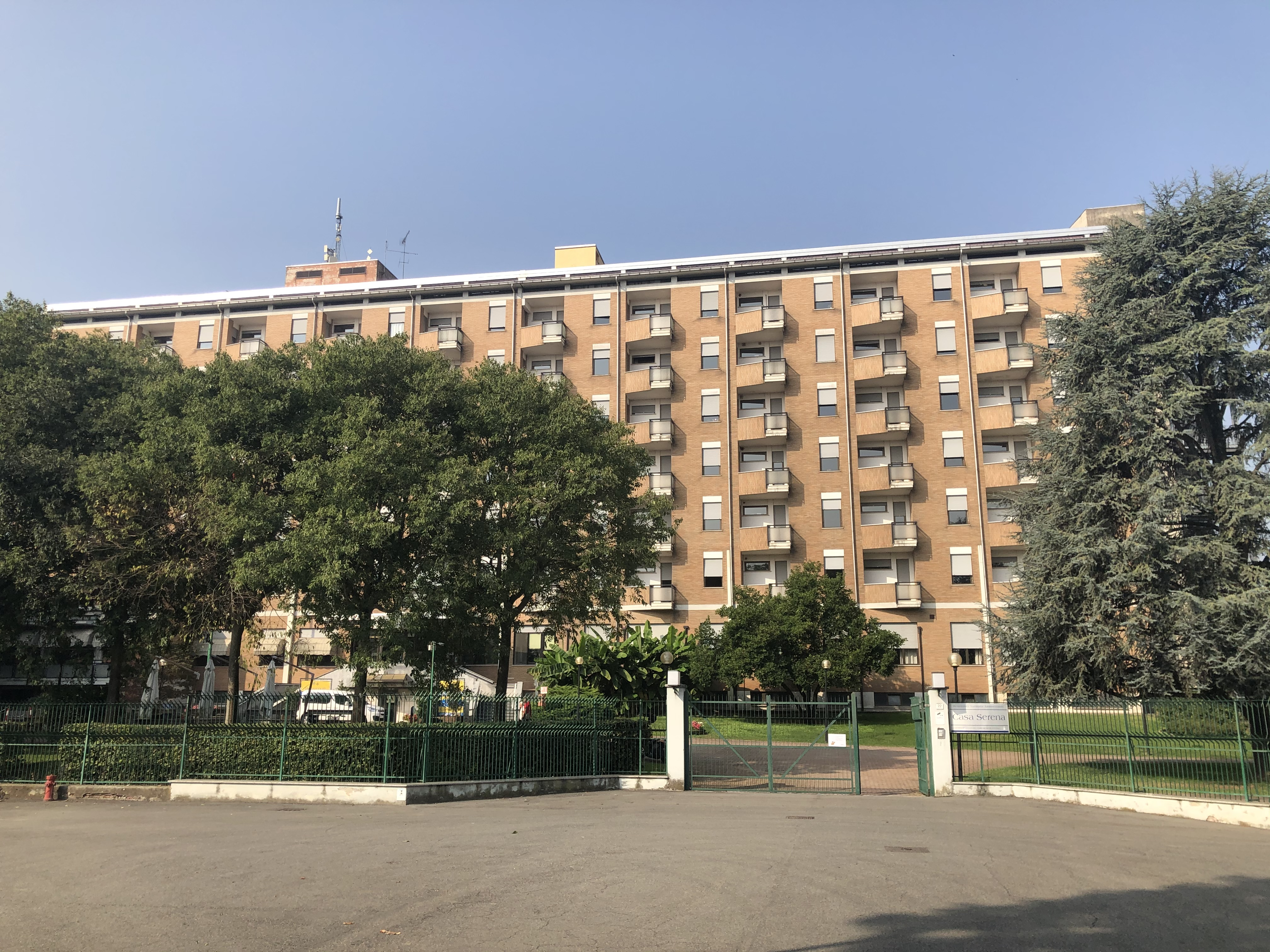
"Serena" House

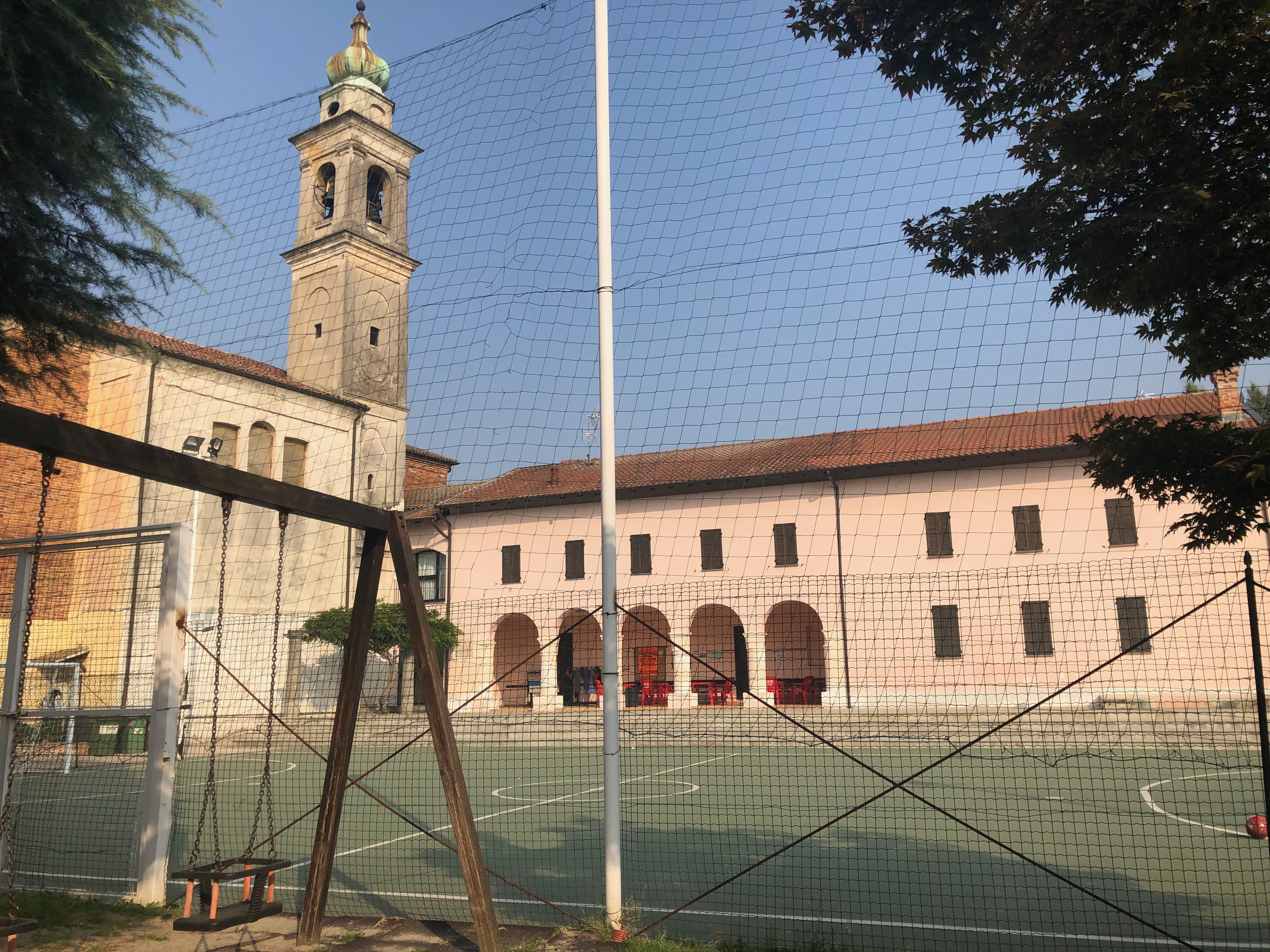
"Divine Providence" oratory, formerly the site of the Dominican convent

After the end of World War II, there were several public works, starting with the construction of a modern sewage system, and continuing with the modernization of the bank offices (the old theater, itself a replacement for the former St. Christopher's Church, was occupied); in 1962, the "Celestina Falzoni" kindergarten was also built. In the same period, the building that housed the "Pietro Conti" middle school was improved, and from 1965 work in the "Sereno" village was enhanced: the road linking the center with the Social Village was opened and, thanks to the financial help of Mario Pavesi, "Casa Serena" was completed in 1967; it consists of a rest home run by the Opera Nazionale Pensionati d'Italia, desired by the founder of Pavesi to facilitate its workers. Later, in 1977 the first scout group was founded in Cilavegna, and this required the construction of a new oratory that could accommodate more people (initially 90 boys and girls): in 1981, therefore, the "Divine Providence" oratory was officially opened, at first consisting only of the convent of the Dominican friars and the church of Santa Maria and later modernized with new classrooms and playgrounds (2 soccer fields and a playground); the old oratory building then became the "Casa del Popolo," a multipurpose center for recreational use and since 1988 the headquarters of the "Cilavegna 1 scout group." An interesting note concerns the asparagus festival, which has been held every year since 1964 on the second Sunday in May, in celebration of a crop dating back to the 16th century A.D.: in addition to the presence of stalls, it is characterized by the traditional parade in 18th-century costumes (in memory of the Taverna family) and concludes with the "pig race," in which four jockeys and their animal companions compete so that the historic winning district (Dosso, Oropa, Castello or Sant'Antonio) is declared.

Since 2006 Cilavegna has been twinned with Condat-sur-Vienne, with which several cultural exchanges have been consolidated, and since 2008 the multipurpose building (consisting of a bowling alley and a municipal theater) was dedicated to the French city.

The Theater, a place where creativity, art, imagination and encounter are best expressed, is well suited to bear the name of the French town as a symbol of alliance and solidarity, which underscores the new role of local authorities as bearers of a "citizen diplomacy, which opens new perspectives on the level of relations between peoples."

— Municipal statement of 2008

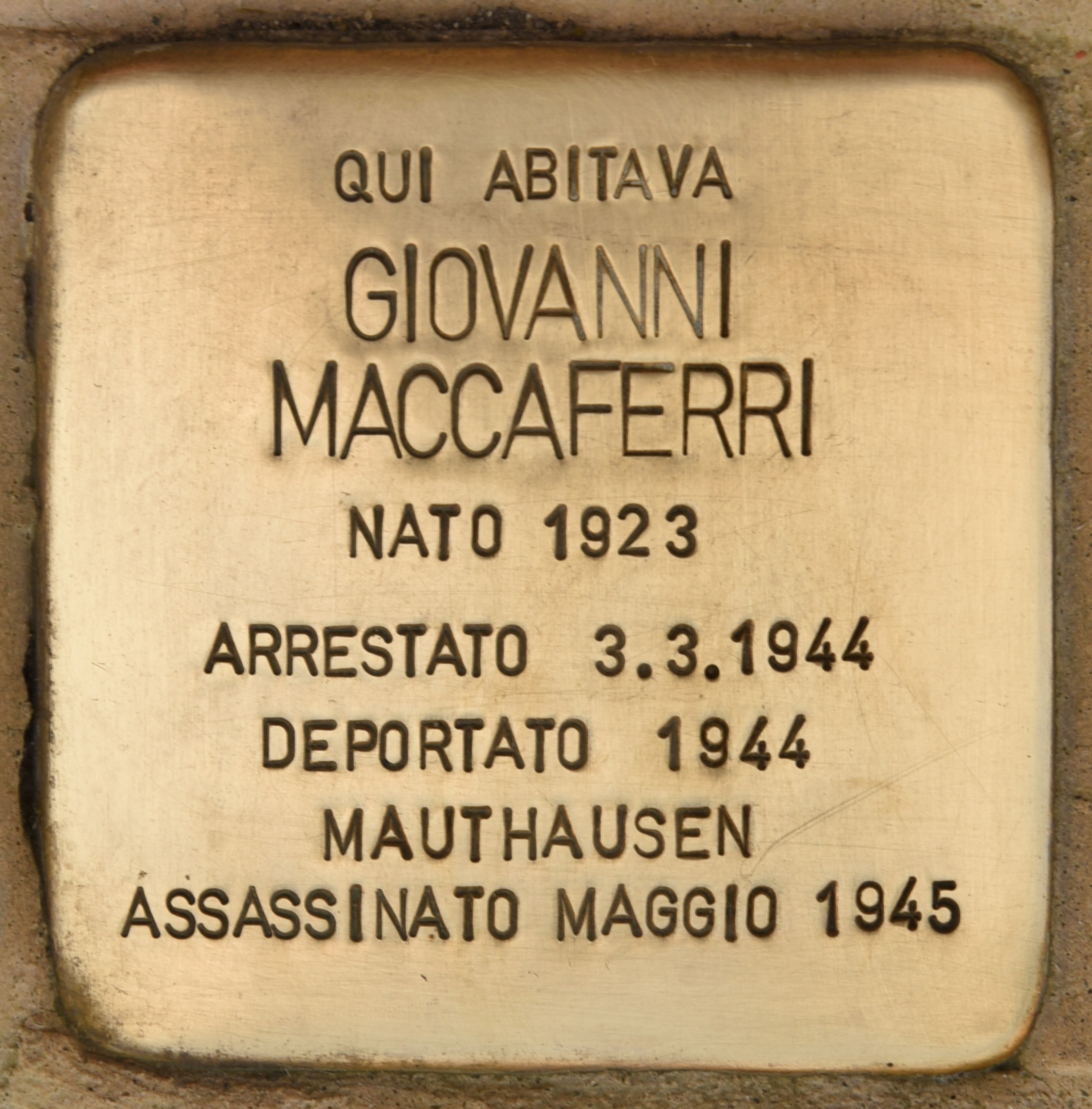
Stumbling stone in honor of Giovanni Maccaferri, deported and murdered at Mauthausen

In 2018 a Territorial Government Plan was approved and revised to bring the town's urban development under control, especially in response to the need to re-establish as much ecological connection as possible: the protection of areas of naturalistic and historical significance resulted in several restrictions in the construction sector, while in the field of services the municipality initiated several projects to improve the road system and sports facilities. In addition to this, the need to populate the agricultural territory with native vegetation was reiterated, with the aim of reconstituting large wooded areas, including "the Oliva forest," already entrusted by the municipal administration to a specialized association. On January 19, 2019, the first stumbling stone was laid in Cilavegna; it is in honor of Giovanni Maccaferri, one of the strikers of March 2, 1944, who was deported and murdered in Mauthausen.

== History of the coat of arms ==
Coat of arms of the municipality of Cilavegna

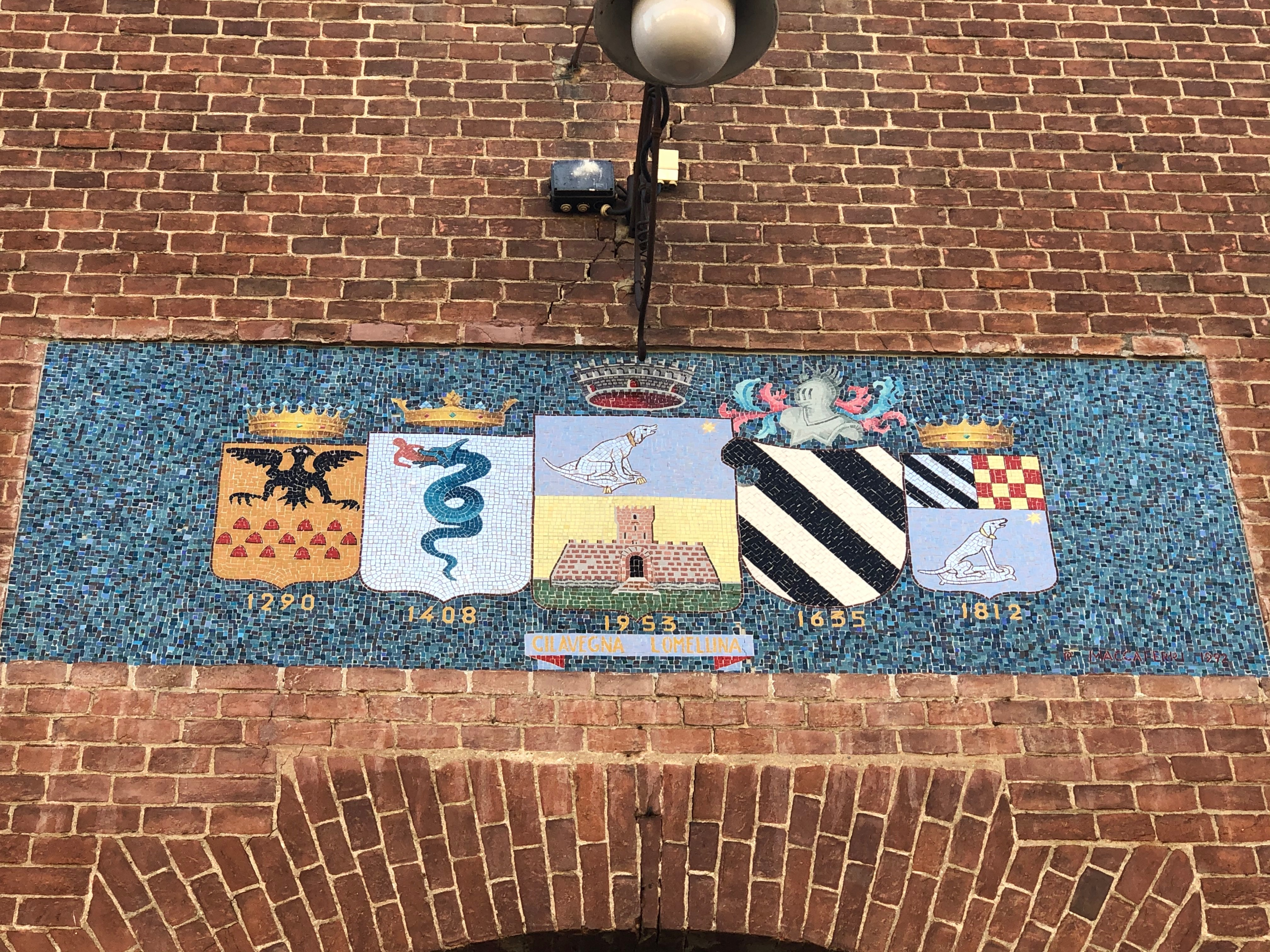
Evolution of the coats of arms of Cilavegna

Truncated: to the first azure and silver gold collared dog, seated on a silver cushion, placed in the left corner, and attaching a gold star in the right corner of the head; the second gold to the castle bricked red and windowed black. External ornaments of the municipality

— Coat of arms granted by Presidential Decree of September 26, 1954

Historically, Cilavegna has never had a heraldic coat of arms, so in 1954 it was necessary to make one: it would have to be truncated, so that the ancient Taverna coat of arms would be flanked by the figure of the castle. Granted then by the heraldic office, the project was entrusted to Piero Maccaferri.

From then on, the coat of arms was always that one, but it was often criticized because it was not faithful to the facts of the town's history: the field dedicated to the Taverna lordship, in fact, would be extraneous to the Cilavegna branch, since the aforementioned coat of arms refers to the lords of Landriano. The ancient emblem of the Taverna family included a single white field with three black transverse volumes, while the presence of the "dog" was typical of the counts of Landriano; such a figure, however, was introduced in Cilavegna as well only on the occasion of the union of the feud with the "major" one, and this was probably the reason why the two branches were often confused with each other. In conclusion, it can be assumed that the coat of arms in its present configuration, with the intention of placing a reference to the Tavernas in the first field, should have presented three large black volumes at the top.

A further version is represented by the symbol adopted in 1458, "two keys in a transverse cross with a trefoil handle," presumably in reference to the emblem of St. Peter, the patron saint of the village. This alternative, however, does not consist of a coat of arms from the past since at that time the village was identified with the emblems of the Sforza family. It is precisely to the latter that the use of the keys could be linked, which would go to represent the subjugation of Cilavegna to the lords of Milan.

== See also ==
- Cilavegna
- Lomellina
- Laevi

== Bibliography ==
- Amministrazione comunale di Cilavegna, ed. (2005). Voci resistenti: da Cilavegna, dalla Lomellina alle Valli, testimonianze, storie, poesie ... raccontano le vie diverse per la Liberazione, per vivere e farla vivere oggi come 60 anni fa.
- Barni, Luigi (1922). Note archeologiche sulle origini di Vigevano. Mortara: Tip. Monchietti.
- Bergamo, Romano (1995). Storia dei comuni, frazioni e parrocchie della Lomellina. Vol. 1. Pavia: Selecta Editrice.
- Calvi, Carlo (1874). Cenni storici sulla Lomellina fino al sec. X. Mortara: Tip. Cortellezzi.
- Colli, Antonio (1881). Ricerche storiche sulla Lomellina. Mortara: Tip. Cortellezzi.
- Colombo, Alessandro (1933). Cartario di Vigevano e del suo comitato. Vigevano: Tip. Nazionale.
- Conti, Flavio; Hybsch, Vincenzo; Vincenti, Antonello (1990). I castelli della Lombardia.
- Corsico, Mario; Di Bari, Rolando (1988). Rotary club della Lomellina (ed.). Castelli di Lomellina.
- Galandra, Marco (2003). Castelli in Lomellina. Pavia: Iuculano.
- Grassi, Don Siro (1950). Breve storia del Santuario di Sant'Anna. Bellinzona (Svizzera): Istituto editoriale Ticinese.
- Manaresi, Alfonso (1929). Storia moderna. Milano: Tip. Trevisini.
- Merlo, Mario (1971). Castelli, rocche, case-forti, torri della Provincia di Pavia.
- Nicolucci, Giustiniano (1864). La stirpe ligure in Italia nei tempi antichi e moderni. Napoli: Tip. Stamperia del Fibreno.
- Olivieri, Dante (1931). Dizionario di toponomastica lombarda. Milano: Tip. La famiglia meneghina.
- Pollini, Enrico (1871). Stamperia dell'unione tipografico editrice (ed.). Annuario storico-statistico Lomellino per l'anno 1872.
- Pollini, Enrico (1872). Annuario storico lomellino per l'anno 1873. Mortara: Tip. A. Cortellezzi.
- Portalupi, Luigi (1756). Storia della Lomellina, e del principato di Pavia, dai suoi primi abitatori, sino all'anno 1746. Lugano: Stamperia Elvetica.
- Rampi, Roberto (1965). Cilavegna: dalle origini ai giorni nostri. Vigevano: Crespi.
- Rossi, Giovanni (2009). Amministrazione comunale di Cilavegna (ed.). Ciaciare in silavgnin.
- Rossi, Giovanni; Bagatin, Emilio (2003). Pro Loco di Cilavegna (ed.). Cilavegna è... : cenni storici sulle origini del paese e scene di vita quotidiana del secolo scorso.
- Rossi, Giovanni (2006). Amministrazione comunale di Cilavegna (ed.). Giovanni Rossi (Barsachin) racconta le radici del suo paese.
- Rossi, Giovanni (2003). Cilavegna : 1875-1945 : album dei ricordi. Novara: EOS.
- Soriga, Renato (1913). Documenti pavesi sull'estimo del secolo XIII in B.S.P. di storia-patria. Vol. 13.
- Tagliacarne, Giovanni (1846). La Lumellina antica e moderna. Torino: Tip. Stamperia Reale.
- Tomiato, Stefano (2010). Un'antica produzione scomparsa: la vitivinicoltura in Lomellina (PDF).
