= Ruth Jordan =

American schoolteacher (1902–1996)

Ruth Woolf Jordan (November 7, 1902 – January 7, 1996) was a schoolteacher from Sedona, Arizona who developed the Jordan Historical Park and the Sedona Heritage Museum with her husband, orchardist Walter Jordan.
