= List of historic properties in Sedona, Arizona =

- City
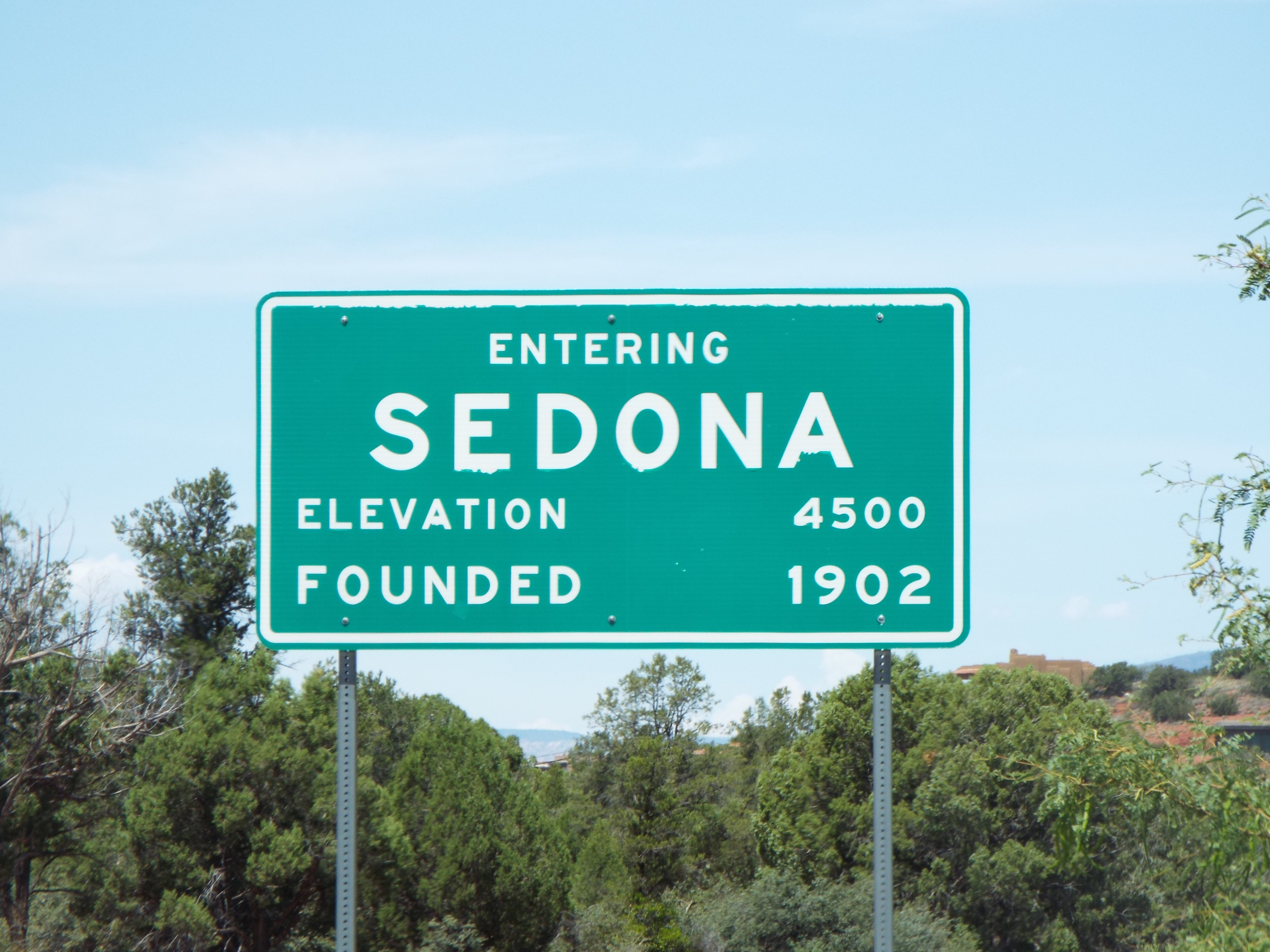
- Entering the City of Sedona

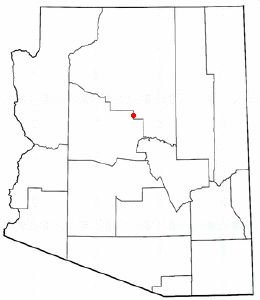
- Location of Sedona in Arizona
- Coordinates: 34°52′11″N 111°45′40″W

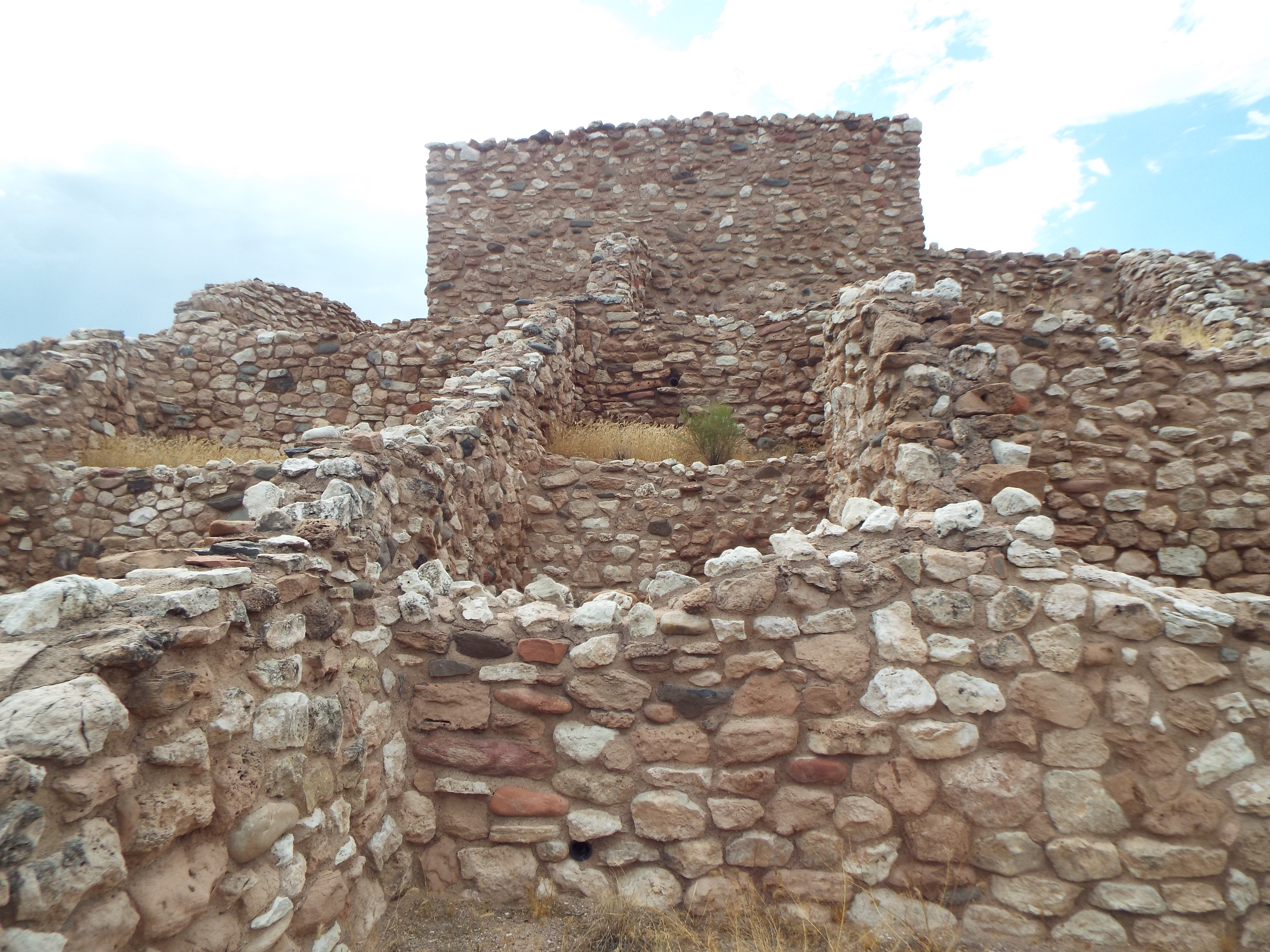
Sinagua village ruins in the Tuzigoot National Monument

This is a list, which includes a photographic gallery, of some of the remaining historic buildings, houses, structures and monuments in Sedona, Arizona (a city that straddles the county line between Coconino and Yavapai counties in the northern Verde Valley region of Arizona). Sedona also has a historical district known as the Pendley Homestead Historic District which is not pictured. The district is located on State Route 89A, 7 miles (11 km) north of Sedona within the Slide Rock State Park. It was listed in the National Register of Historic Places (NRHP) on December 23, 1991; reference: #91001857. Some of the structures are individually listed in the NRHP. Some of the properties have been designated as Sedona Historic Landmarks by the Sedona Historical Society. Sedona has a historic cemetery where the namesake of the city is buried.

== Brief history ==
Among the early people to have inhabited the area were the Sinagua. The Sinagua were a pre-Columbian culture that occupied a large area in central Arizona from 600 to about 1400. The name Sinagua was coined in 1939 by archaeologist Harold S. Colton. It is a Spanish term composed of two words: "sin" which means "without" and "agua" which means "water". The Sinagua disappeared from the area in the early 15th century for reasons that remain a mystery. They were followed by the Yavapai and Apache who settled the sides of Oak Creek canyon.

The area came under Spanish rule in what Spain claimed was New Spain. The first Europeans arrived in the region in 1583, when a group of Spanish explorers led by Antonio de Espejo came in search of gold and silver. They were searching for the Seven Cities of Cibola, whose streets were supposed to be paved with gold. In 1821, the Mexican War of Independence between Mexico and Spain came to an end and the territory of New Spain, which included Arizona, was ceded to Mexico.

In 1846, the United States declared war against Mexico in what became known as the Mexican–American War. The conflict with Mexico ended in 1848. In 1854, the United States purchased the region from Mexico in what is known as the Gadsden Purchase.

John James Thompson from Utah was one of the first Anglo-Europeans to settle the region of Oak Creek Canyon. In 1876, he found an abandoned garden, which he called the "Indian Gardens". still bearing crops. Three years later, the family of Abraham James arrived. James had been an acquaintance of Thompson in Utah and he married Thompson's daughter, Margaret. Thompson built a log cabin there and began cultivating the old Indian Gardens where the Indians had grown corn and squash. Thompson died in 1917. There is a historical marker in the location where the Thompson family once had their cabin. The marker is located on Arizona Route 89A at milepost 378 south of Old Indian Road.

=== Theodore and Sedona Schnebly ===
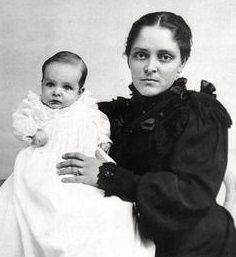
Sedona Schnebly (the city's namesake) and her son Ellsworth (Tad) Miller Schnebly in a christening gown in 1898

Theodore Carlton Schnebly met and married Sedona Arabella Miller in Gorin, Missouri. Sedona was born on February 24, 1877, in the town of Octavia, Missouri. The name Sedona was "just thought up" by her mother because she believed it sounded pretty. Theodore's brother Ellsworth Schnebly lived in Oak Creek. He encouraged Theodore and Sedona to move to Arizona. Theodore and Sedona Schnebly moved to Oak Creek in 1899 and eventually owned eighty acres of land, a small general store and a hotel which they operated out of their home. Guests never paid more than $1 a day for room and board. Sedona cooked for everyone and performed the numerous chores of a farm woman, tending the garden, helping to herd and brand the cattle.

Theodore contributed to the construction of a post office and eventually became the locations first postmaster. Among the names which he proposed to the Postmaster General in Washington for the station and which the new settlement would have been known as were "Oak Creek Crossing" and "Schnebly Hill Station". However, both were not accepted by the Postmaster General because they were too long. Then Ellsworth, Theodore's brother suggested that he name the town and station Sedona, after Theodore's wife. He did just that and on June 26, 1902, the Postmaster General approved the name "Sedona."

The Schnebly family continued to live in Sedona, however in 1905, tragedy struck the family when their 6-year-old daughter Pearl was entangled with a horse that she was riding and was trampled to death. The Schnebly family briefly returned to Missouri, but returned to Sedona a short time later. Since they lost all of their properties, Theodore and Sedona began to work in the Walter and Ruth Jordan farm. Sedona began to save funds to build a chapel. The Wayside Chapel was completed and dedicated in 1950 to Sedona Schnebly. She was suffering from cancer at that time. She died on November 13, 1950, and Theodore died four years later on March 13, 1954. Sedona, Theodore and Pearl Schnebly are buried in the Cooks Cedar Glade Cemetery in Sedona.

=== Walter and Ruth Jordan ===
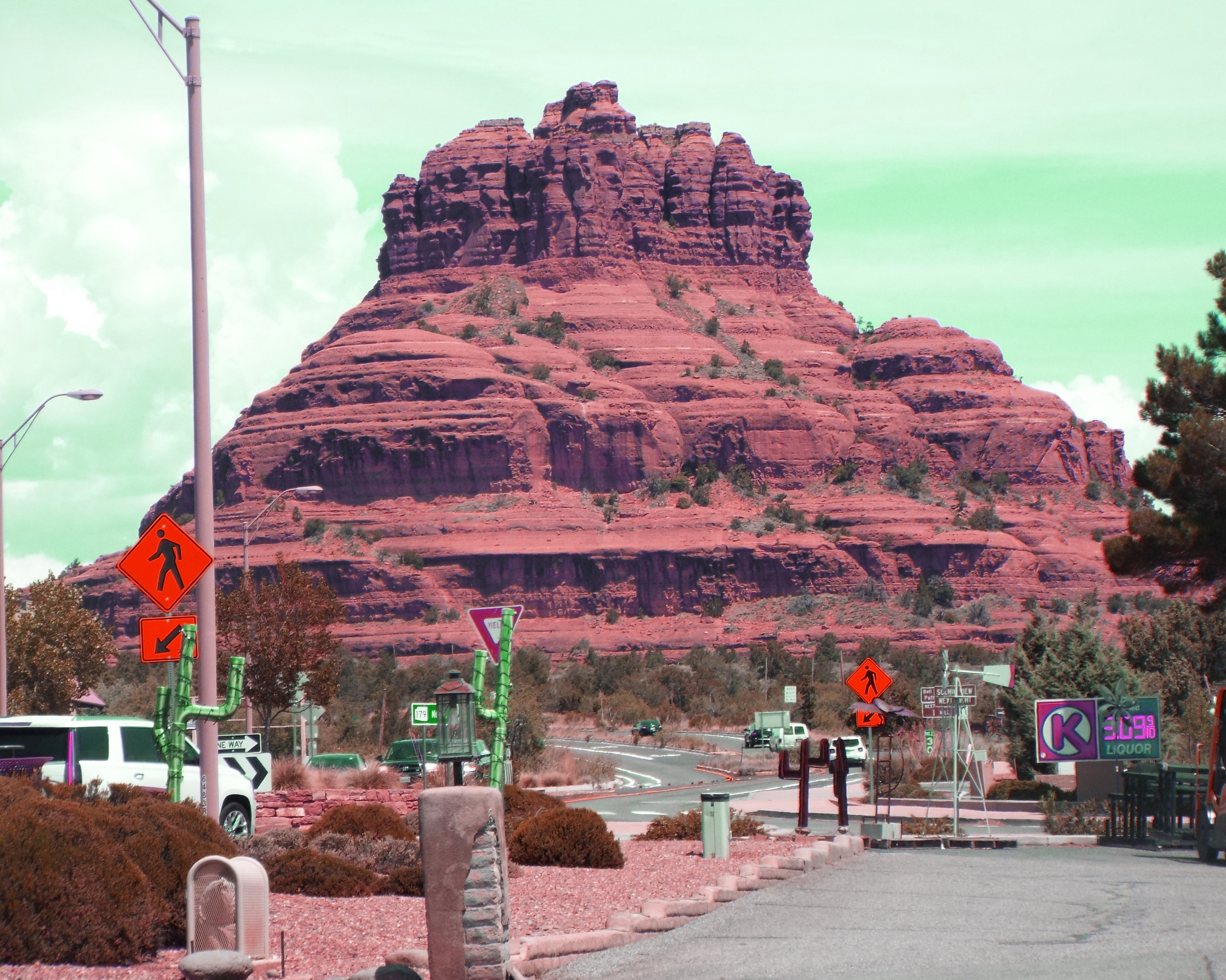
Bell Rock

Walter Everett Jordan was born in 1897 on the Upper Verde property, near Clarkdale, Arizona. His father had a farm in the Sedona area and Walter grew up helping the family doing farm chores. Eventually Walter bought his father's share of the farm. He grew fruit trees in his sixty-five acres of land in Sedona .

Jordan was introduced to Ruth Marie Woolf, a classmate of his sister Stella, who attended the Tempe Normal School (now Arizona State University). They fell in love and were married in 1930. The Jordan family built a one-room cabin in their farmstead, which would eventually have various rooms added. By the mid-1930s the Jordans had established themselves as shippers of quality fruit throughout Arizona and nationwide.

Walter Jordan died in 1987, Ruth became a member of the Sedona Historical Society. She was active in conserving her farmstead as the Jordan Historical Park and Sedona Heritage Museum. Ruth died in 1996. The town which had been established in 1902, was incorporated as a city in 1988.

== The Sedona Historical Society ==
The mission of the Sedona Heritage Museum, which houses the Sedona Historical Society, is to preserve the ever-growing history of Sedona. They focus on community events, education, history preservation, archives and restoration.

A property may be listed in the National Register of Historic Places or it may be eligible to be listed as such, however that does not mean that the property is safe from being demolished by its owner. According to Jim McPherson, Arizona Preservation Foundation Board President:

"It is crucial that residents, private interests, and government officials act now to save these elements of our cultural heritage before it is too late."

The Sedona Fire & Police Departments Building is an example. There is a historical marker on the outdoor mall called The Shops at Hyatt Piñon indicating the exact location where the building once stood before it was demolished.

== Historic buildings and bridge ==
The following is a brief description of a historic bridge and some of the historic buildings in Sedona.

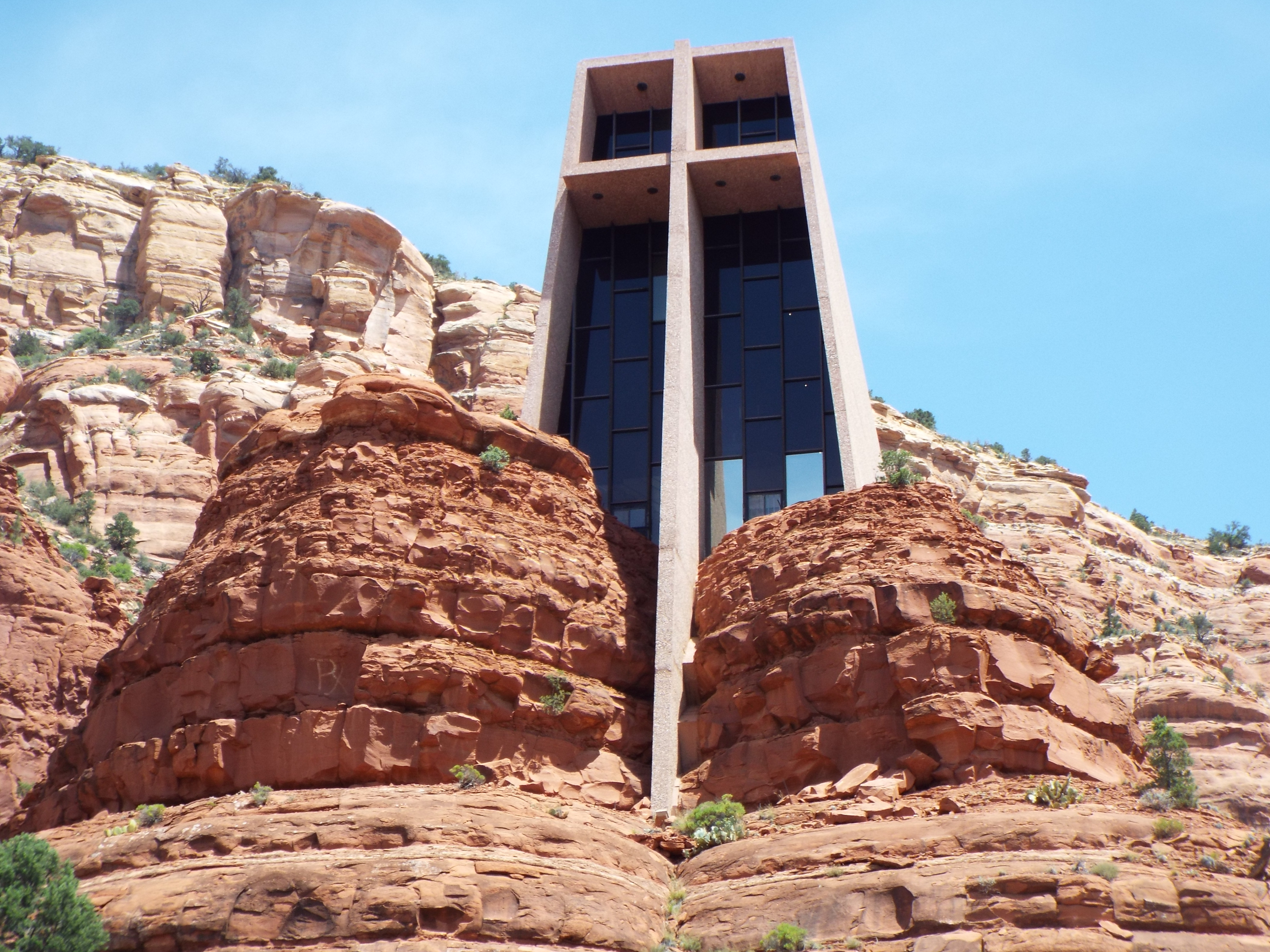
Chapel of the Holy Cross

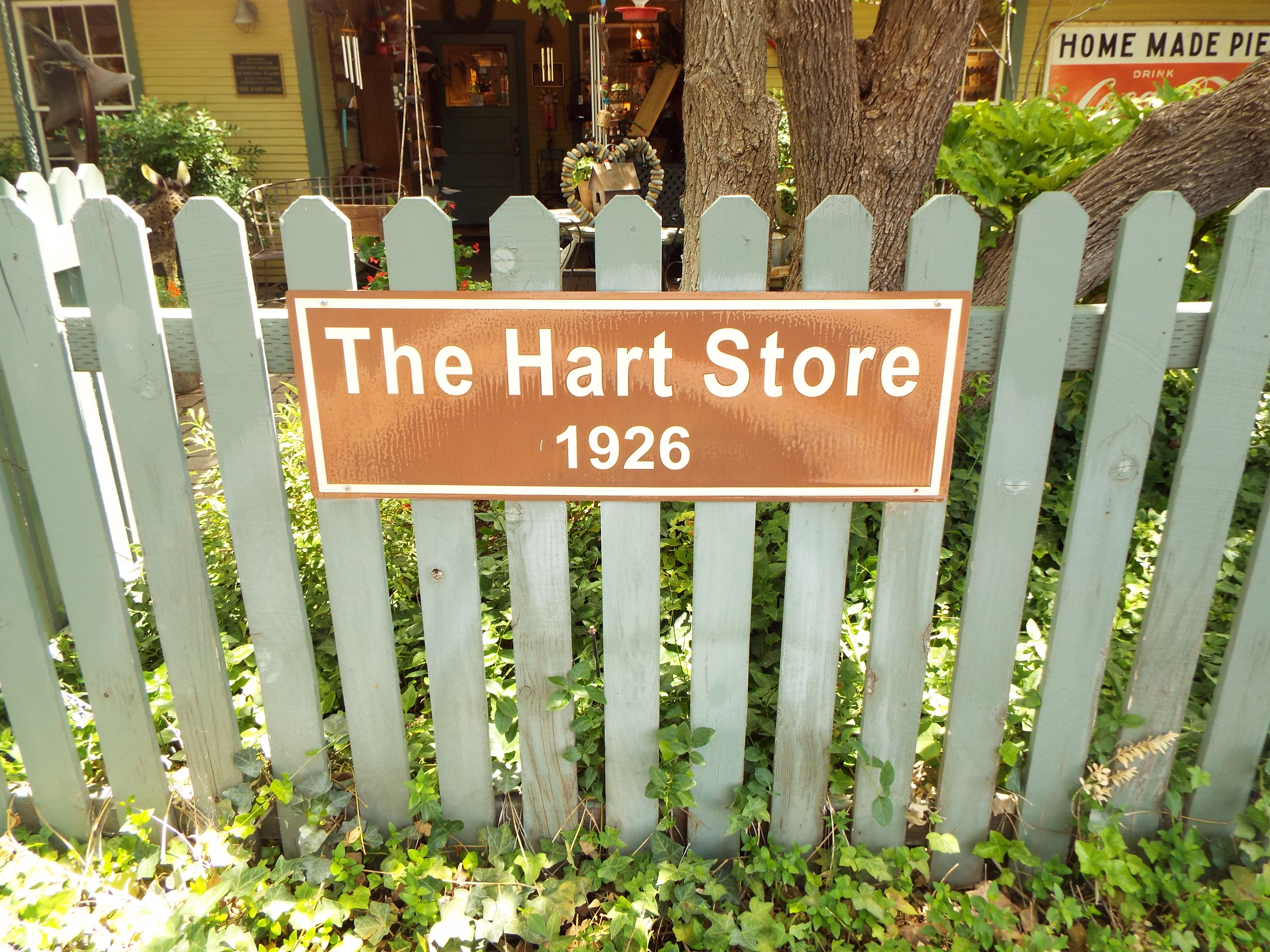
The Hart Store established in 1926

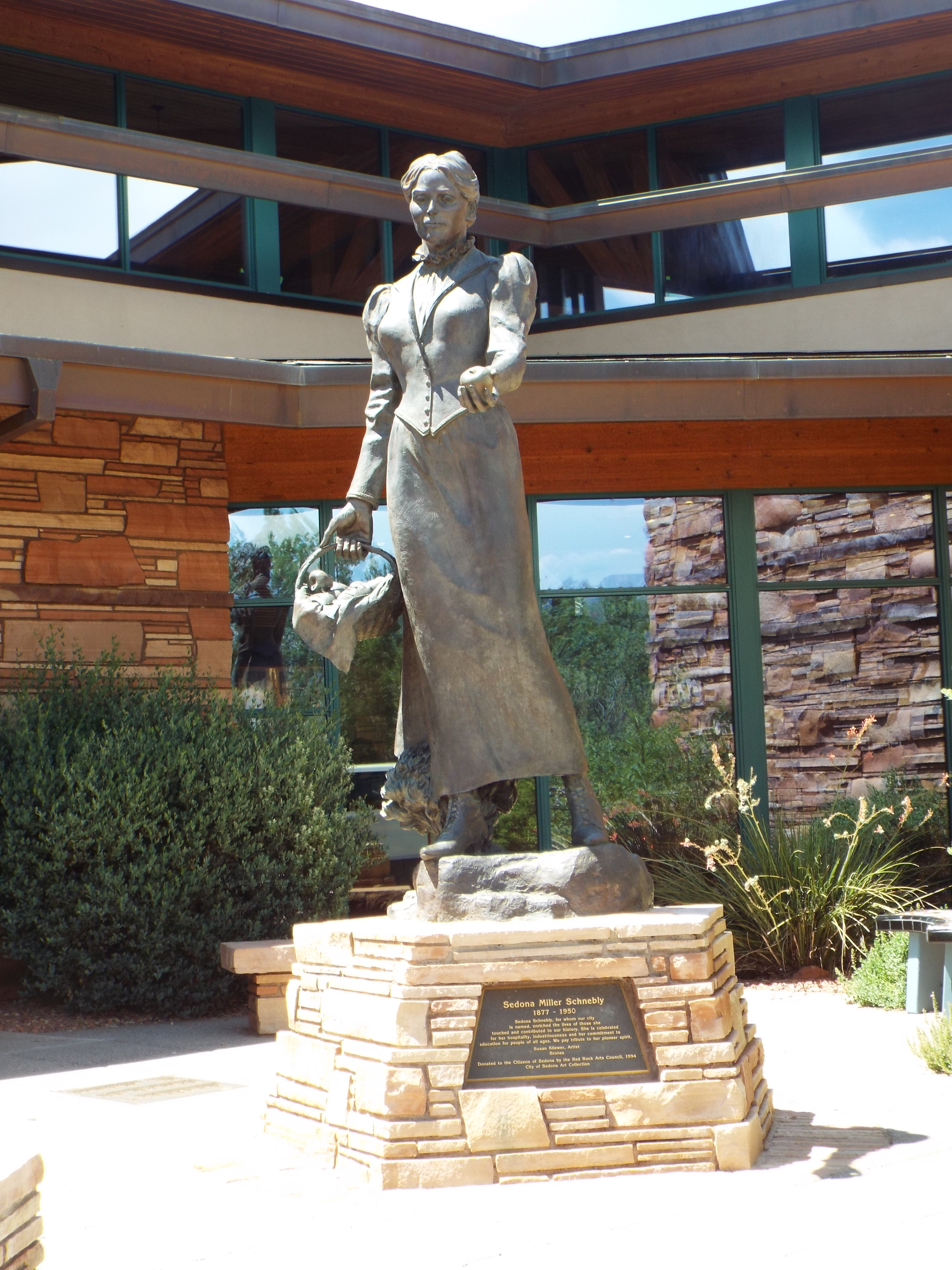
Statue of Sedona Schnebly in the Sedona Public Library

- The Chapel of the Holy Cross – built in 1956 and located at 780 Chapel Road. The Chapel of the Holy Cross is an extraordinary architectural achievement, designed by architects Anshen & Allen. Its modern design and construction were considered bold and daring in the 1950s, winning an ALA Award of Honor in 1957. It was listed in the National Register of Historic Places on October 6, 2011; reference: #10000947.
- The USFS Ranger House – built in 1917 and located at 250 Brewer Road. This house was the home of the Sedona District Ranger, Jesse I. Bushnell. It continued to serve as a living quarters until 1996, when the structure was converted into an office space for the USFS Sedona Ranger District. It was listed in the National Register of Historic Places on August 29, 2008; reference: #08000810.
- The Sedona Ranger Station Barn – built in 1934 and located at 250 Brewer Road. The barn was built by the Civilian Conservation Corps. It originally housed the forest service livestock, feed and tackle. It was later modified for office and storage facilities.
- The Pushmataha – built in 1960 and located at 360 Brewer Road. Harold and Christine Strohm built their Old-West style building and opened a Museum to showcase their collection of antiques. The Strohms named the building "Pushmataha" after a Choctaw Chief. The name "Pushmataha" means "He has won all the honors of his race."
- The Hart Store – was established in 1926 and located at 100 Brewer Road. L.E. Hart established Sedona's first real store in this building. The general store sold Oak Creek fruit and tourist supplies and was considered modern with gravity-drained gas pumps and the first commercial power in town. It was listed in the National Register of Historic Places on October 25, 2007; reference: #07001099.
- The Van Deren Ranch House – built in 1924 and located at 597 Jordan Road. Earl Van Deren, was a cattleman who purchased 40 acres along the west side of Jordan Road. He worked hard and was able to completely pay off the property debt. He became a successful rancher. The house now is a Bed and Breakfast business.
- The Hart Pump House – built in 1932 and located in rear of a parking lot at 251 SR-179. The building was constructed by the Civilian Conservation Corps.
- The Jordan Sales Building – built in 1938 and located at 470 North Highway 89A. It was built by George Jordan as a co-op retail outlet for fruit produced and marketed by local orchard farmers, including George and his brother Walter. It was a key part in the early commercial development of Uptown Sedona and is a good example of the use of native red rock in architecture.
- The Sedona Public Library – established in 1964 and located at 3250 White Bear Road. In the entrance of the Library is the Sedona Schnebly statue by Susan Kliewer, a local artist, which was unveiled on October 1, 1994. It was Sedona's first Art in Public Places project.
- The McDonald's with a blue arch – When the McDonald's was built there in 1993, Sedona city officials believed that a bright yellow "M" would intrude too much on the surrounding natural scenery. They claimed that gold would clash with the surrounding red rocks, and opted for a more pleasing, soft blue.
- The Wayside Chapel – Sedona Schnebly began to save funds to build this chapel. The Wayside Chapel was completed and dedicated in 1950 to Sedona Schnebly.
- The Midgley Bridge – built in 1939. The bridge was listed in the National Register of Historic Places on March 31, 1989, reference #88001614.

The following are the images of the historic bridge and buildings in Sedona.

Historic structures

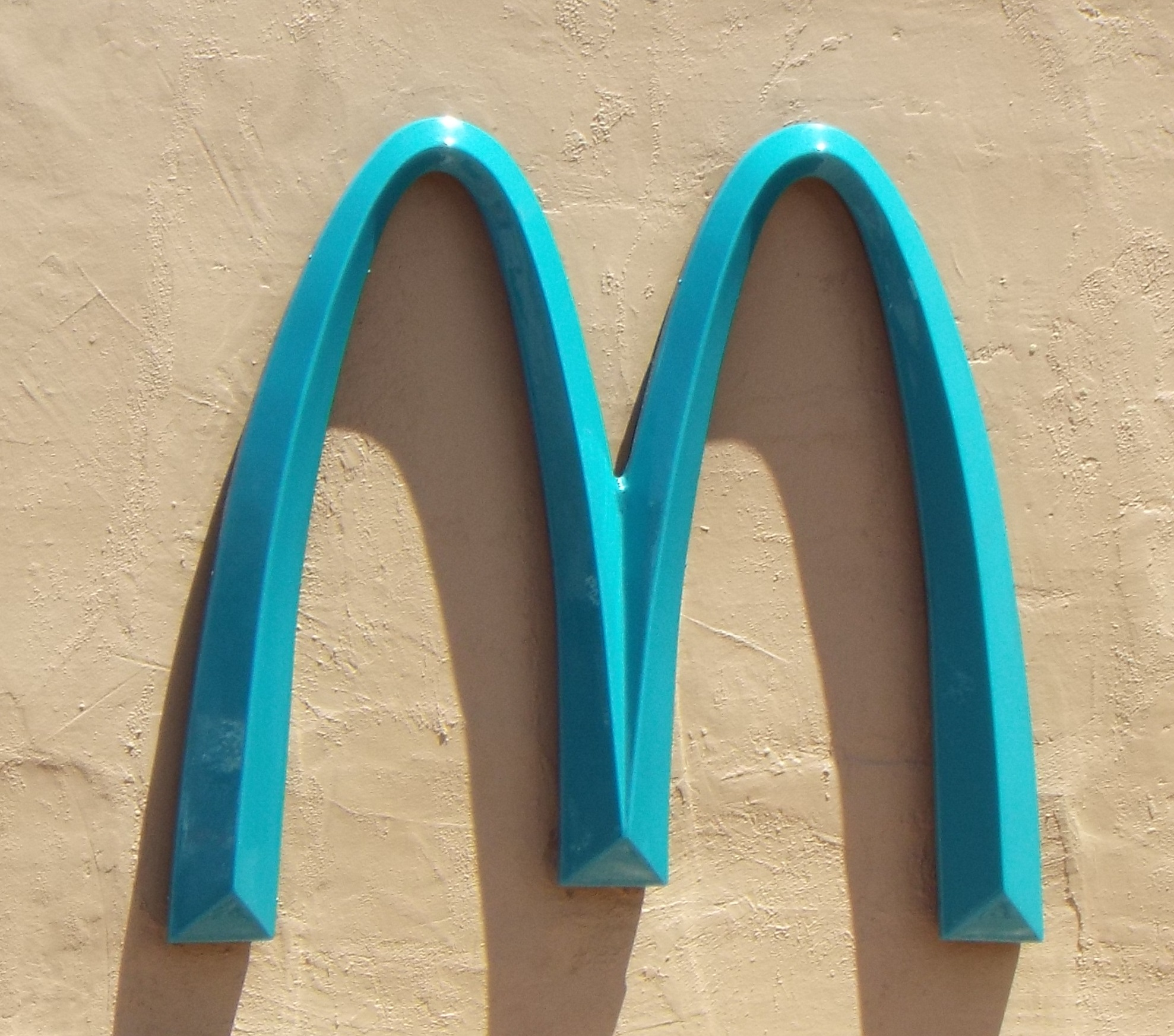
The blue arch

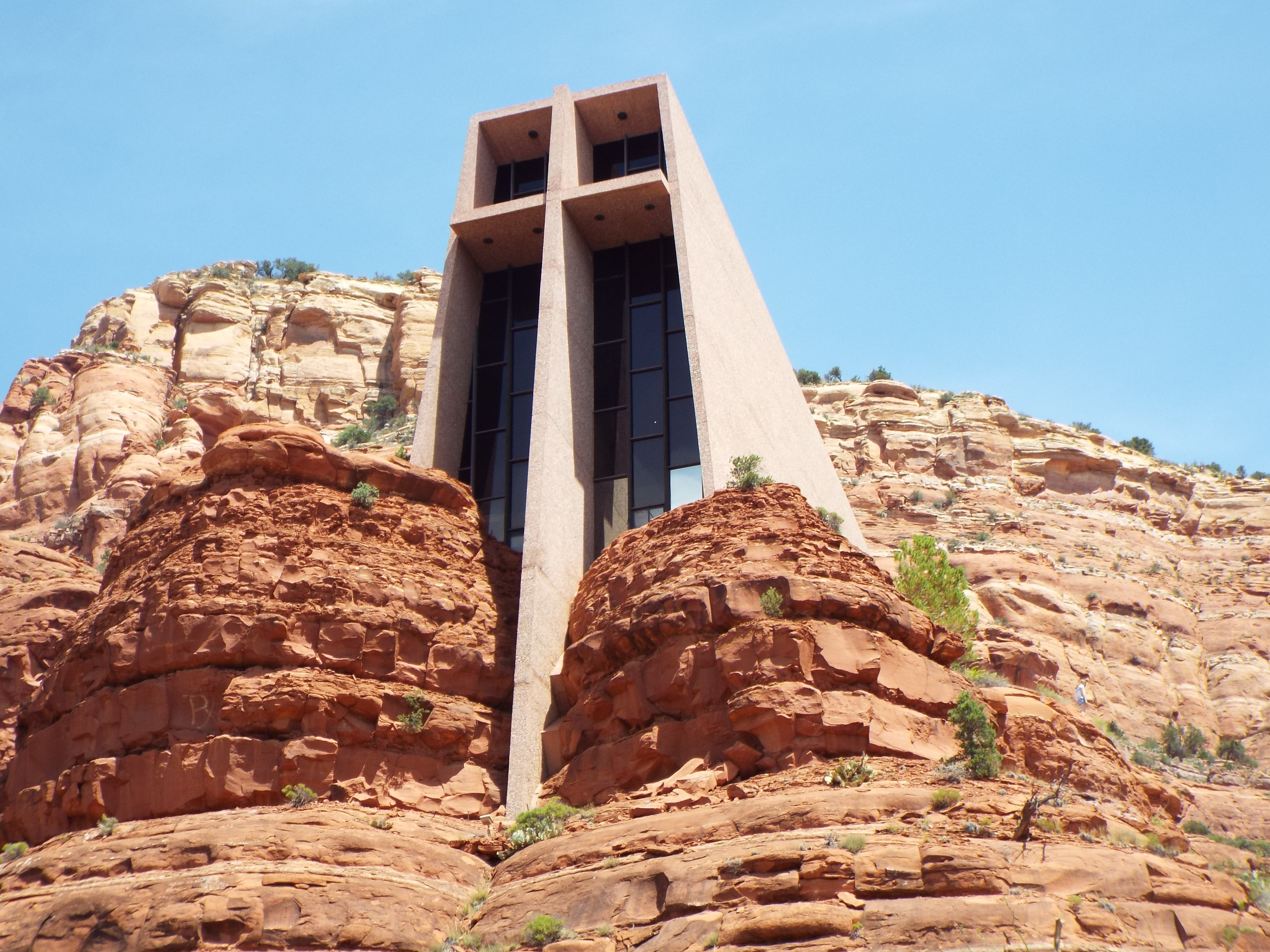
The Chapel of the Holy Cross

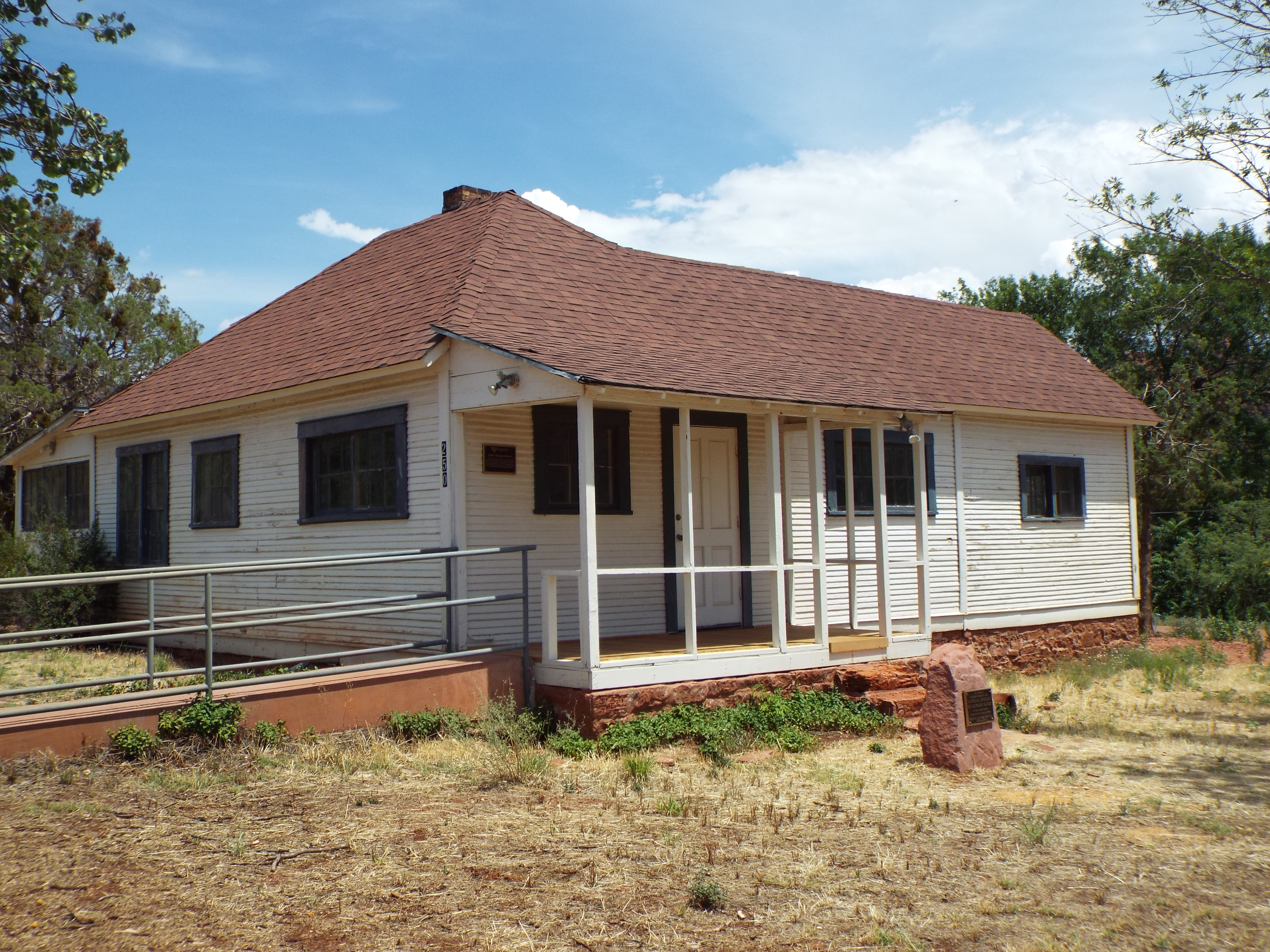
The USFS Ranger House

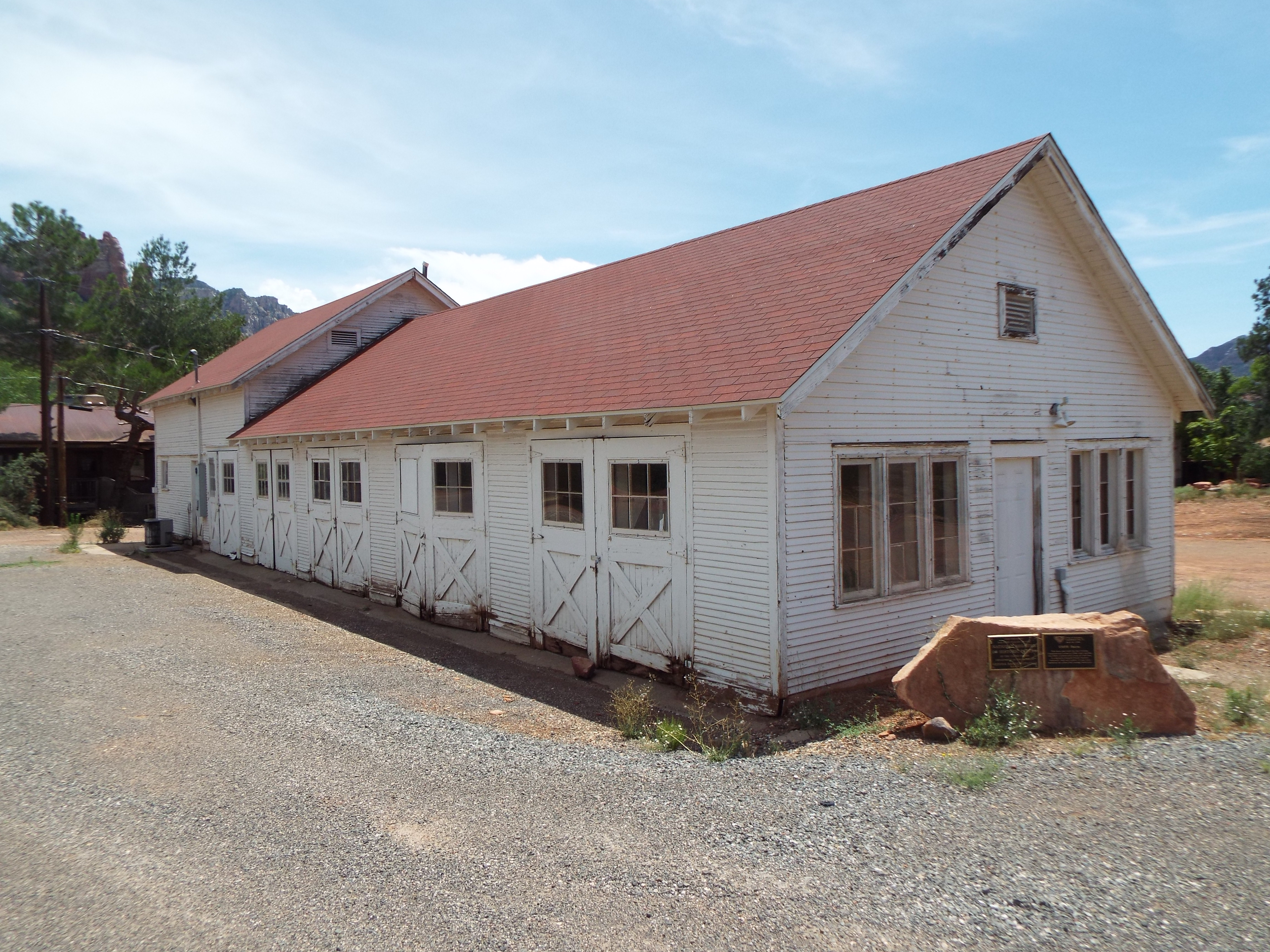
The Sedona Ranger Station Barn

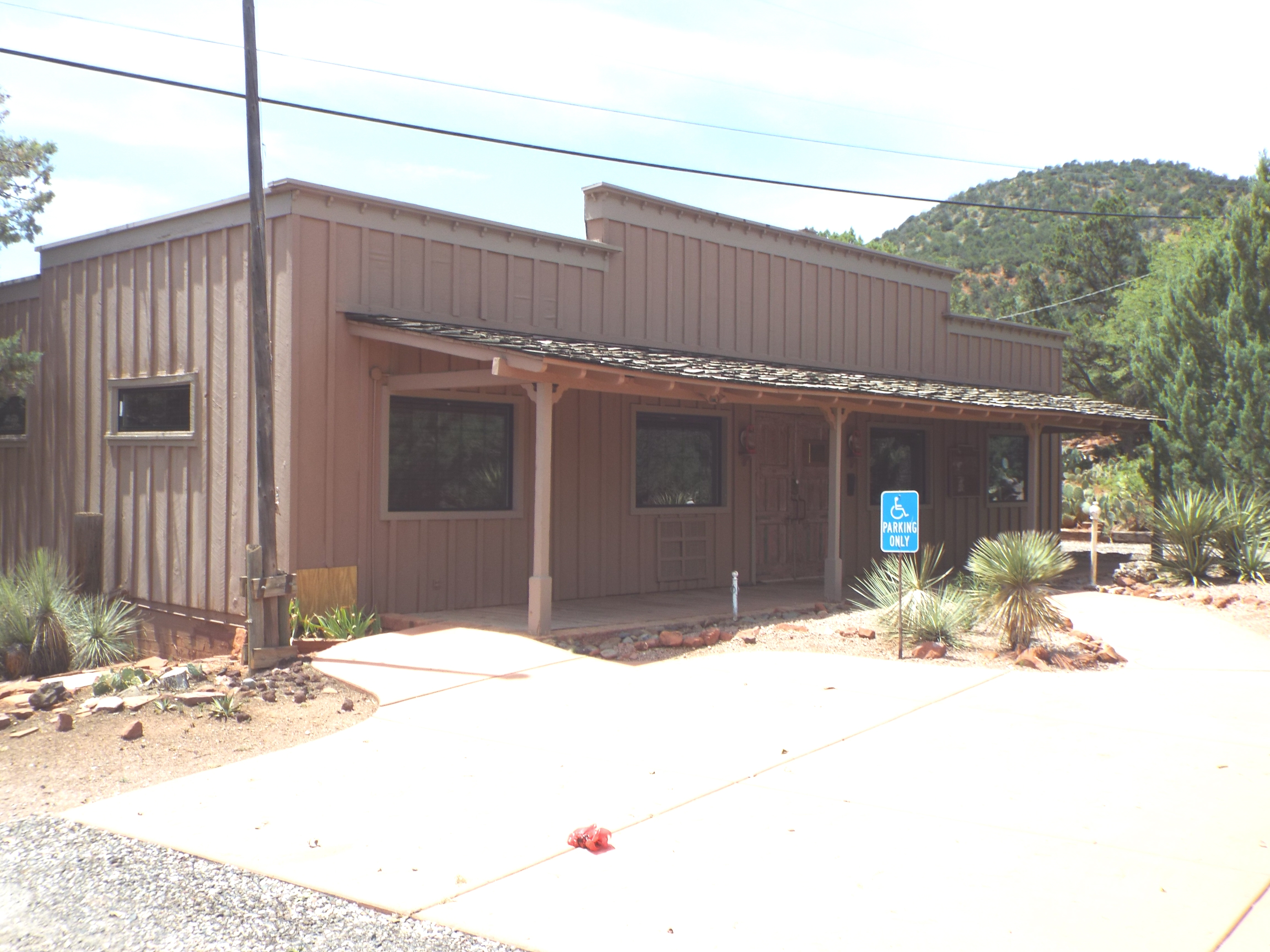
The Pushmataha

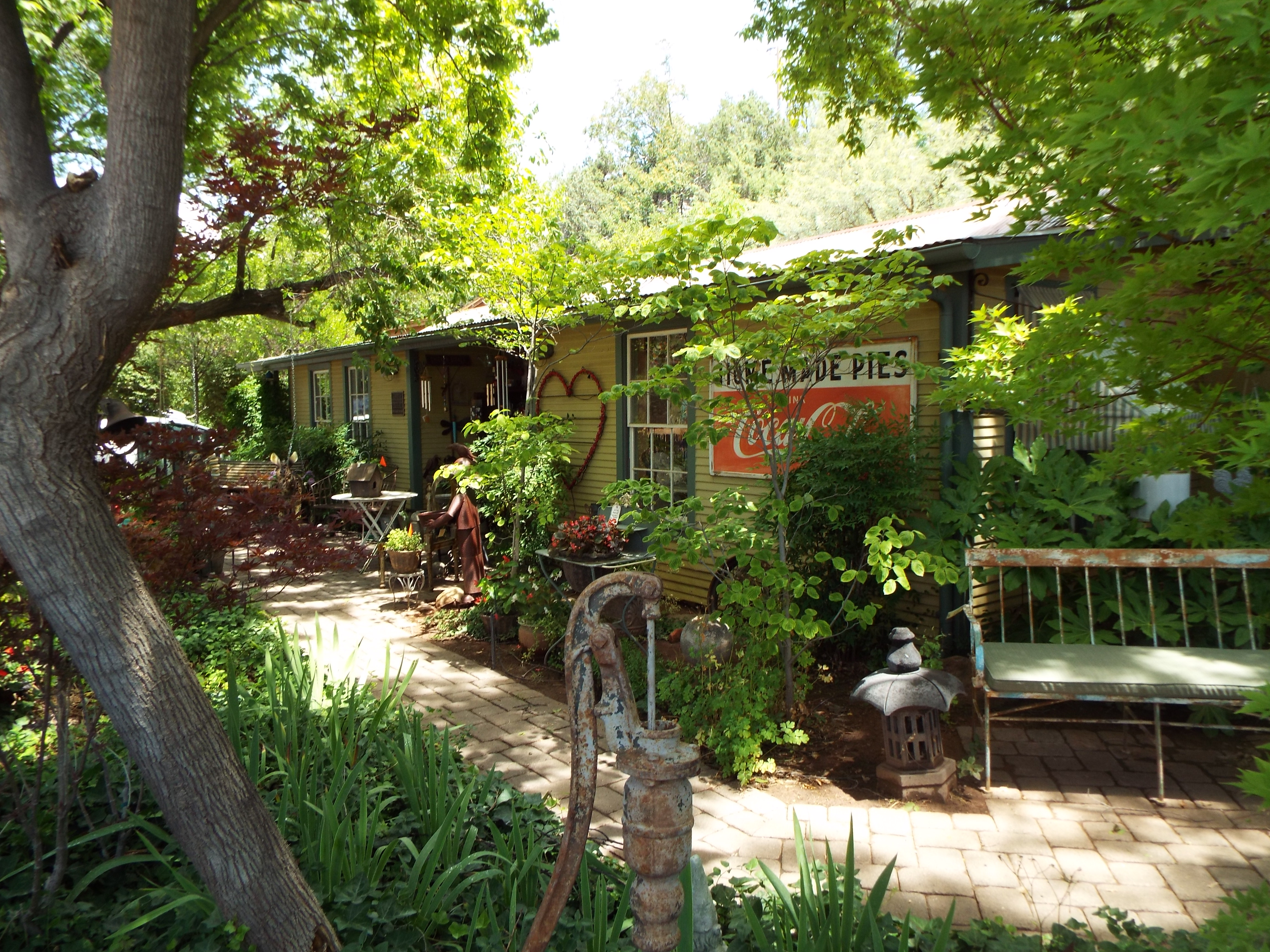
The Hart Store

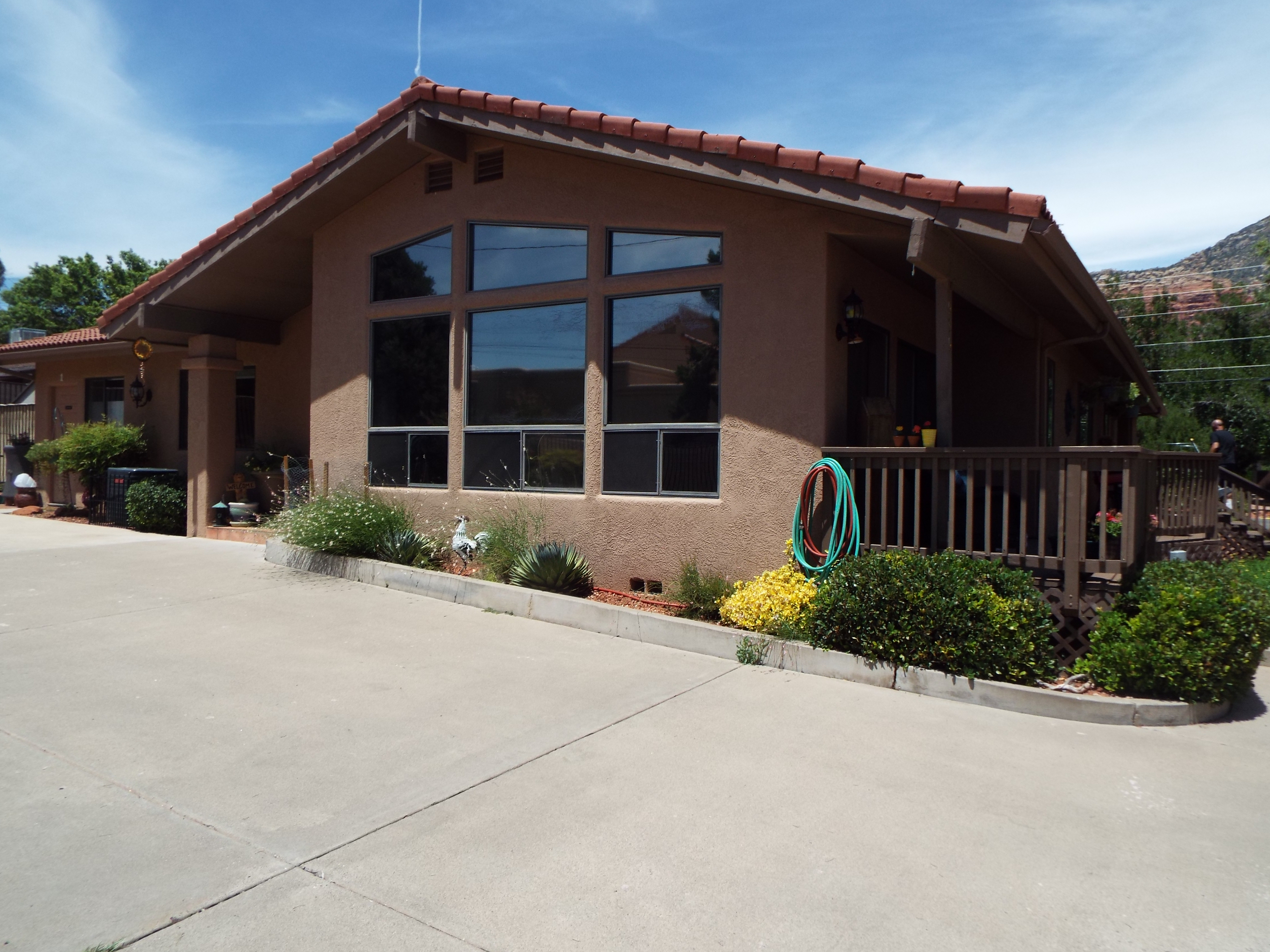
The Van Deren Ranch House

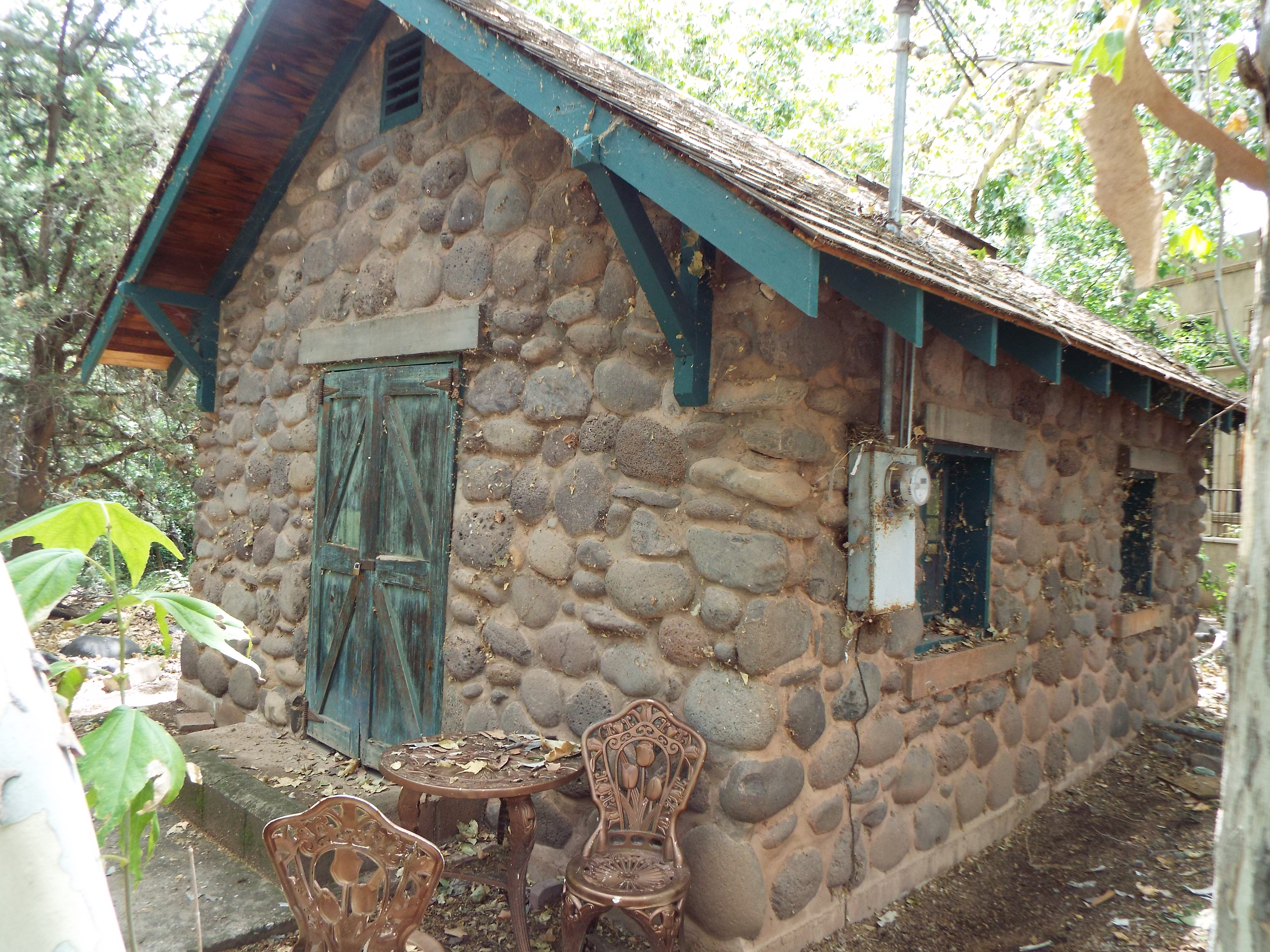
The Hart Pump House

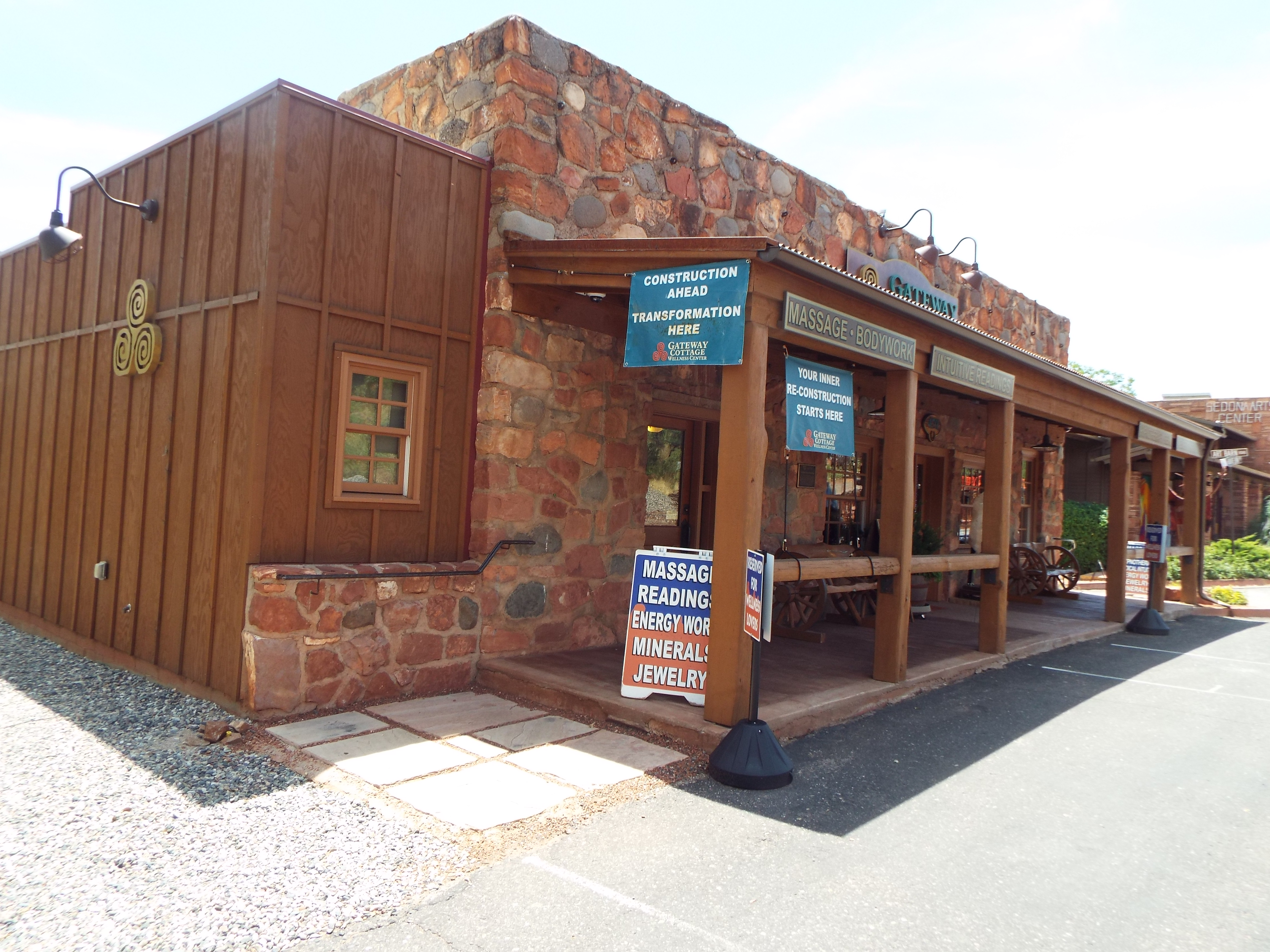
The Jordan Sales Building

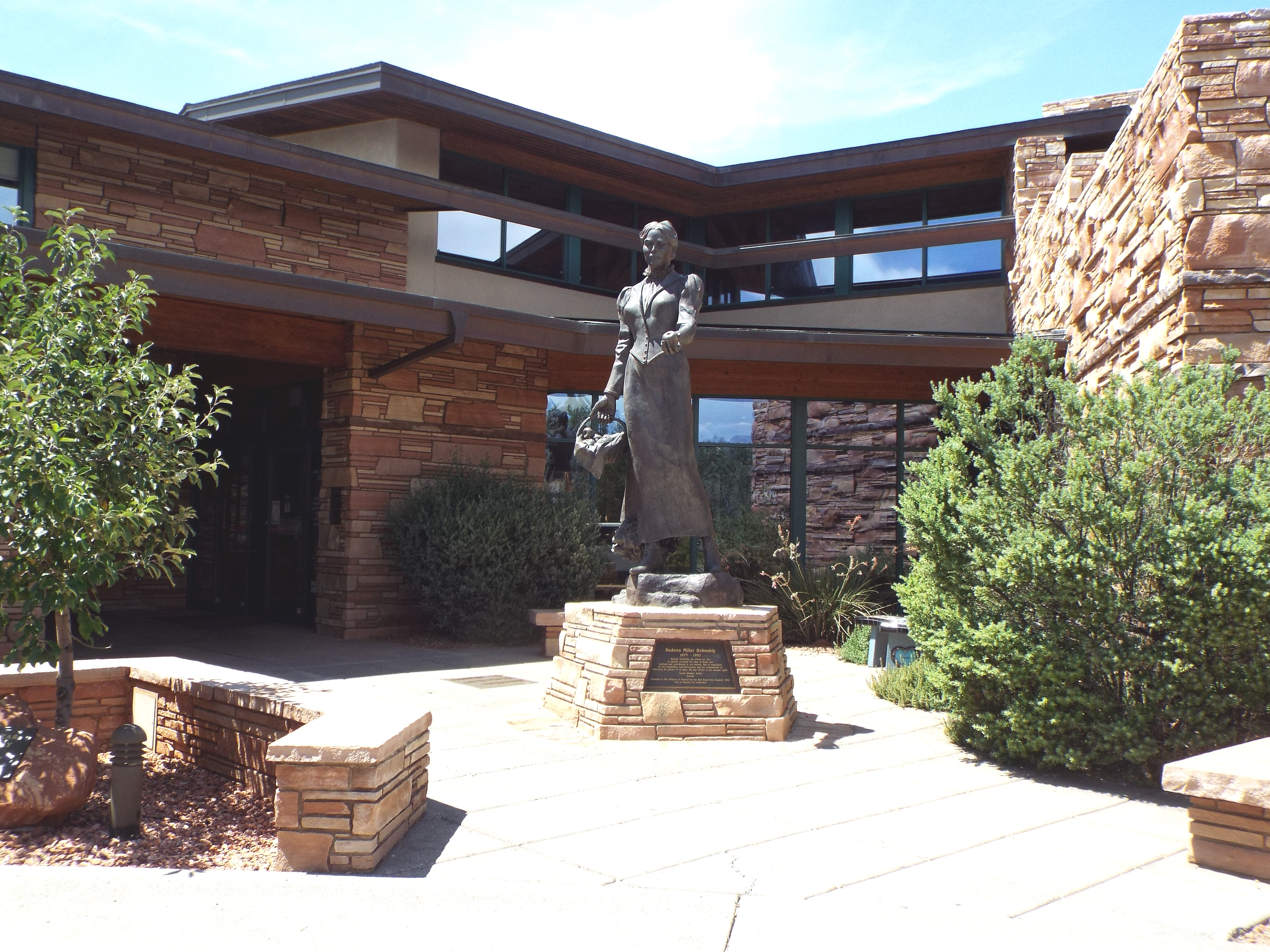
The Sedona Public Library

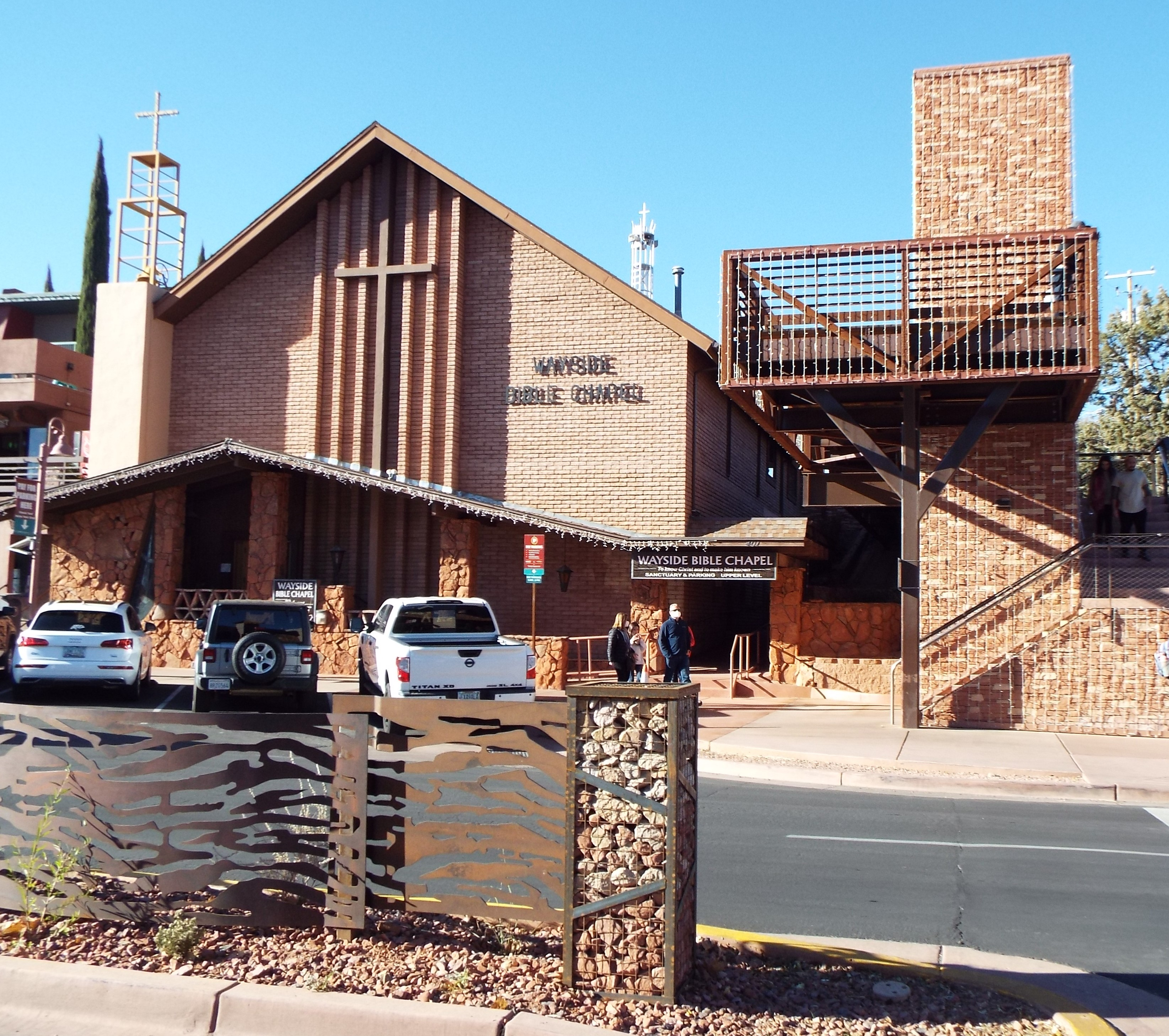
Wayside Chapel

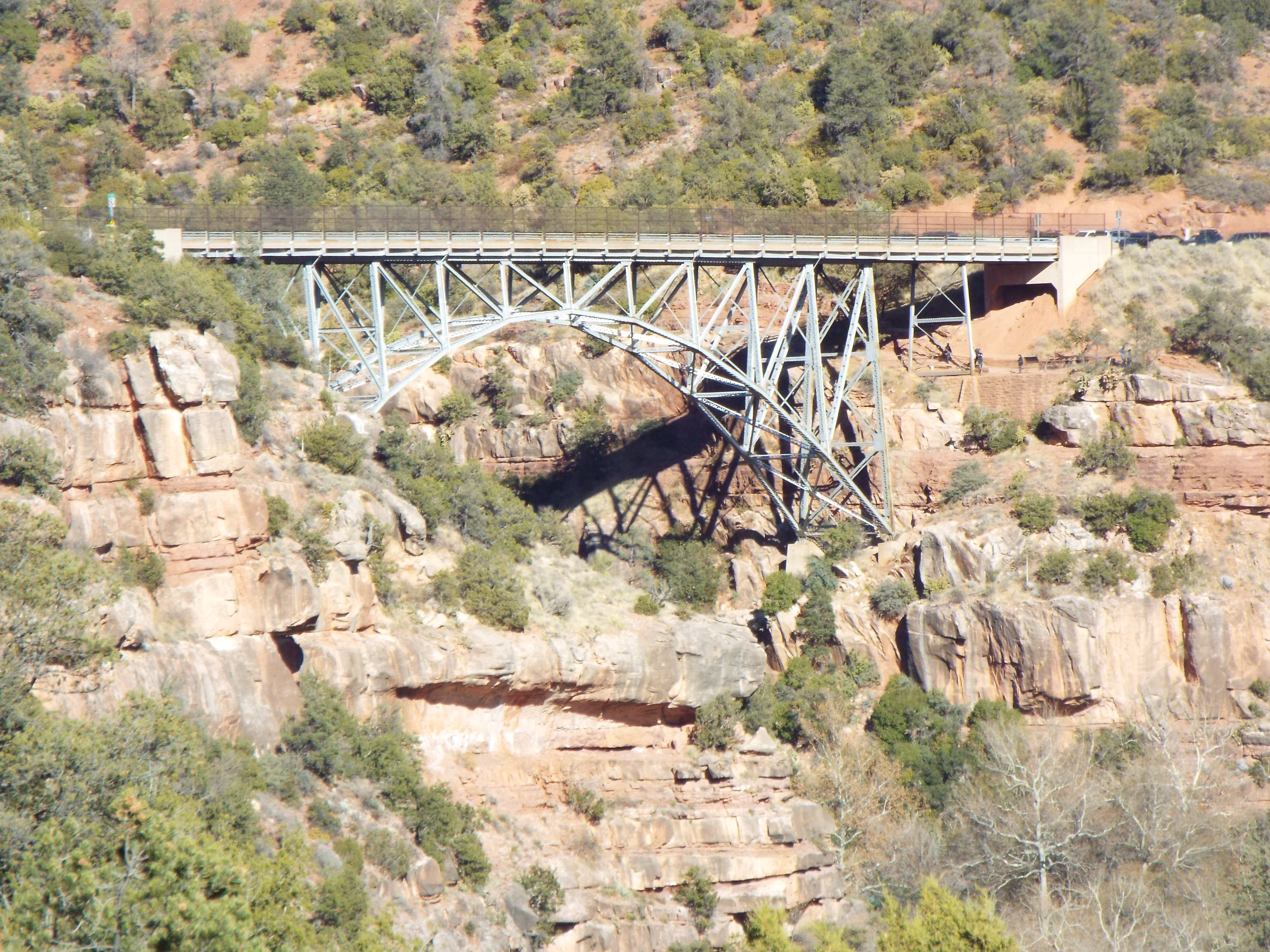
Midgley Bridge

== The Sedona Heritage Museum ==
The Sedona Heritage Museum was established in 1998 and is at located 735 Jordan Road in what once was the Jordan farm. It is also the headquarters of the Sedona Historical Society. The Jordan farm (Sedona Heritage Museum) was listed in the National Register of Historic Places on January 28, 2004, under the title of the "Jordan Ranch"; reference: #03001489. The following structures and artifacts are among the historical properties in the grounds of the museum:

- The Jordan Farmhouse – built in 1931 was the house was the home of Walter and Ruth Jordan. It began as a one-room cabin in 1931. By 1937, it had three rooms. The family continued to expand the house which by 1947, ended up in its present size. It was opened as the Sedona Heritage Museum in 1998.
- The Jordan Tractor Shed – built in 1929 by Walter Jordan to house tractors and other farm implements for use in the Jordan Orchards.
- Tractor equipment – The tractor and farm equipment used in the Jordan farm which is now exhibited in the Tractor Shed.
- The Fruit Packing House – built in 1946.
- The Storytellin Cowboy – by sculptor Susan Kliewer and dedicated on the grounds of the Jordan Heritage Museum on October 26, 2012.
- The Oak Creek Tenthouse – built in 1920. The early settlers in Oak Creek lived in tenthouses.
- The Winona Railroad Station and Telegraph office – built in 1890. It now forms part of the museum's permanent collection. The building was first moved to Sedona from its original site in the town of Winona, Arizona, in order to be used in the movie industry.
- Fire Truck #1 – Sedona's first Fire truck a 1942 Ford-Maxim.
- The Schnebly family carriage – The 1902 Schnebly horse-drawn carriage.
The Jordan farm
(Sedona Heritage Museum)

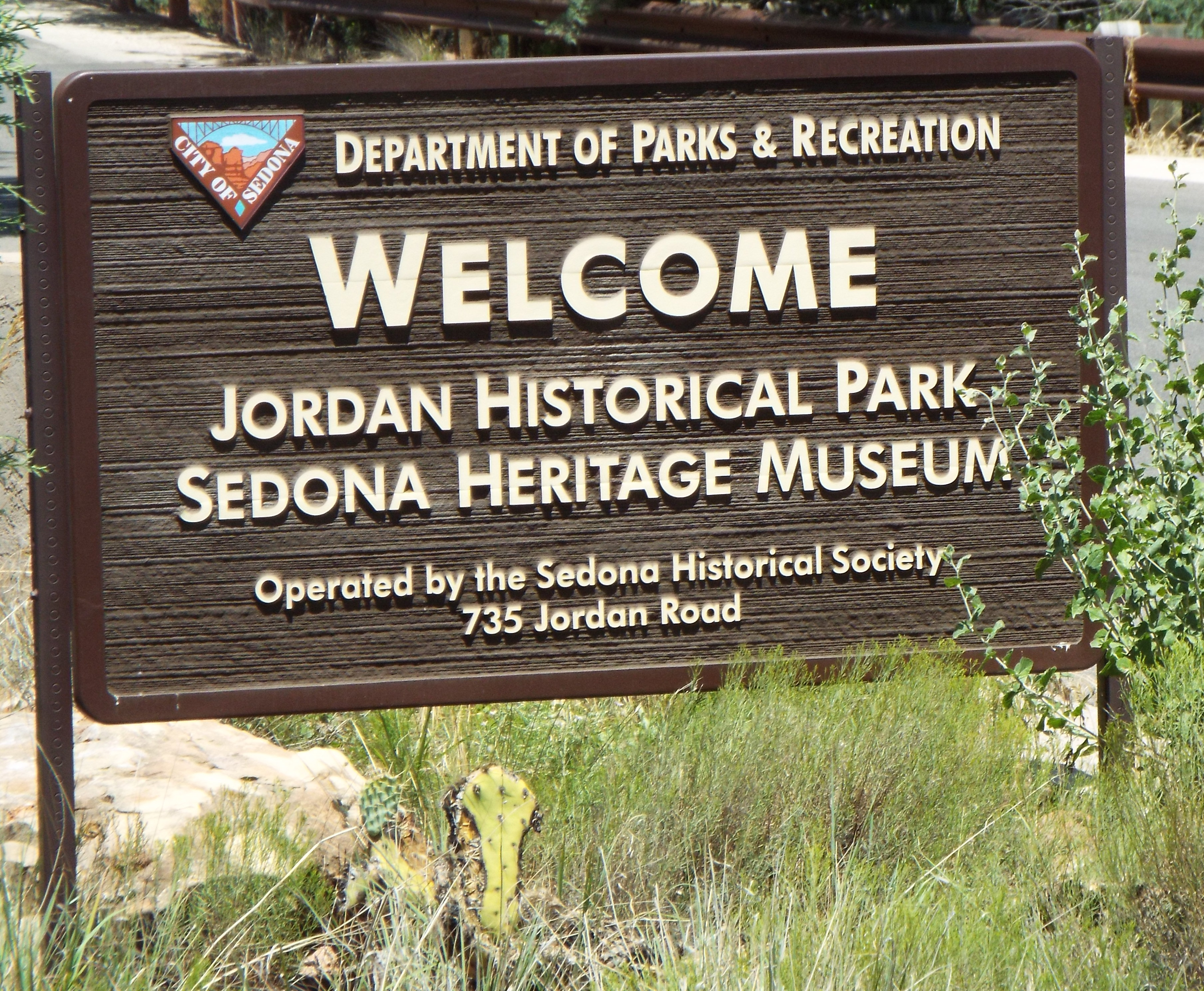
Welcome to the Jordan Historical Park

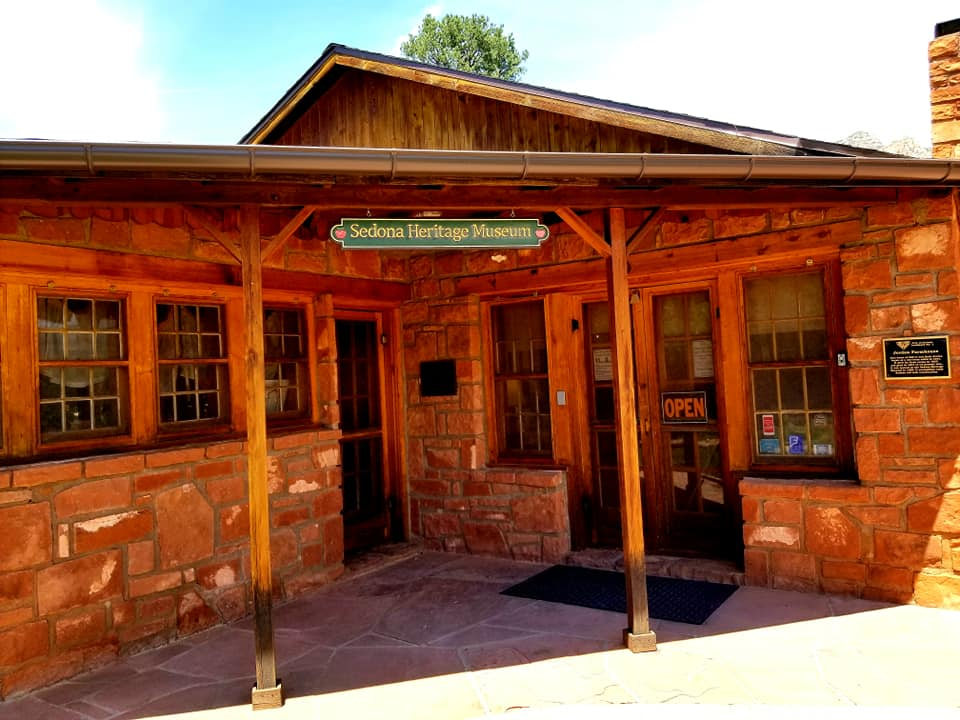
Jordan Farmhouse

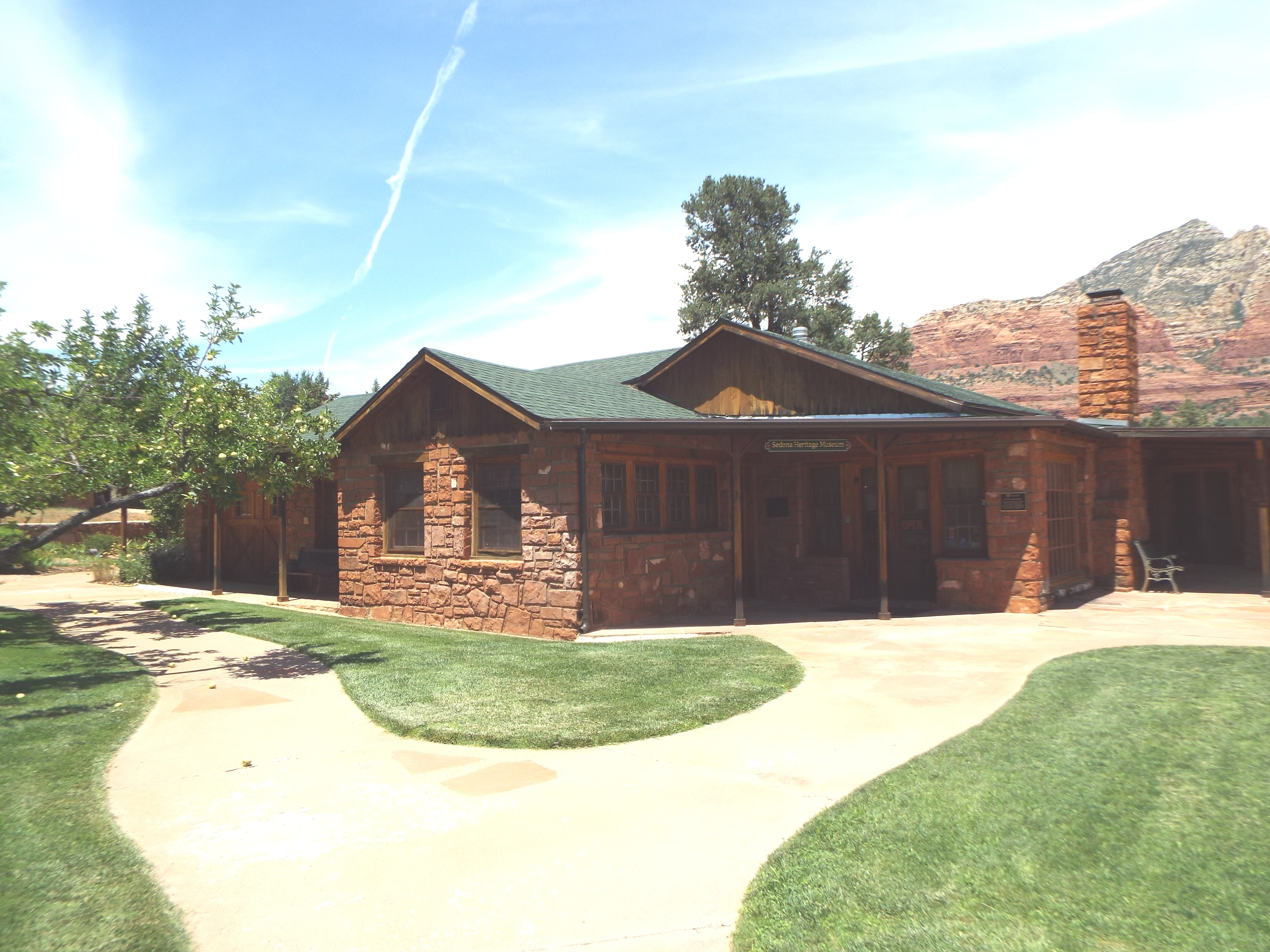
Different view of the Jordan Farmhouse

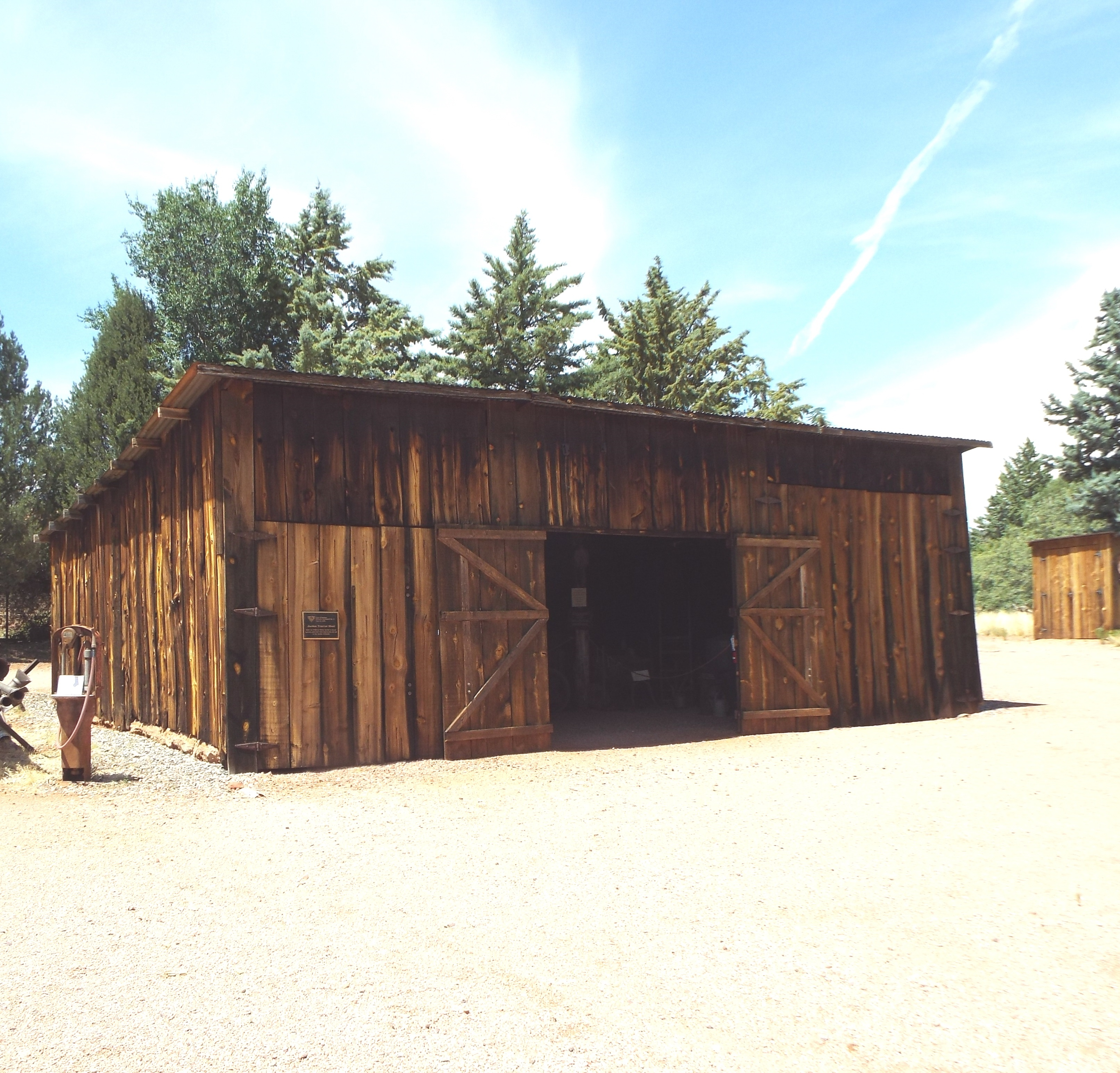
Jordan Tractor Shed

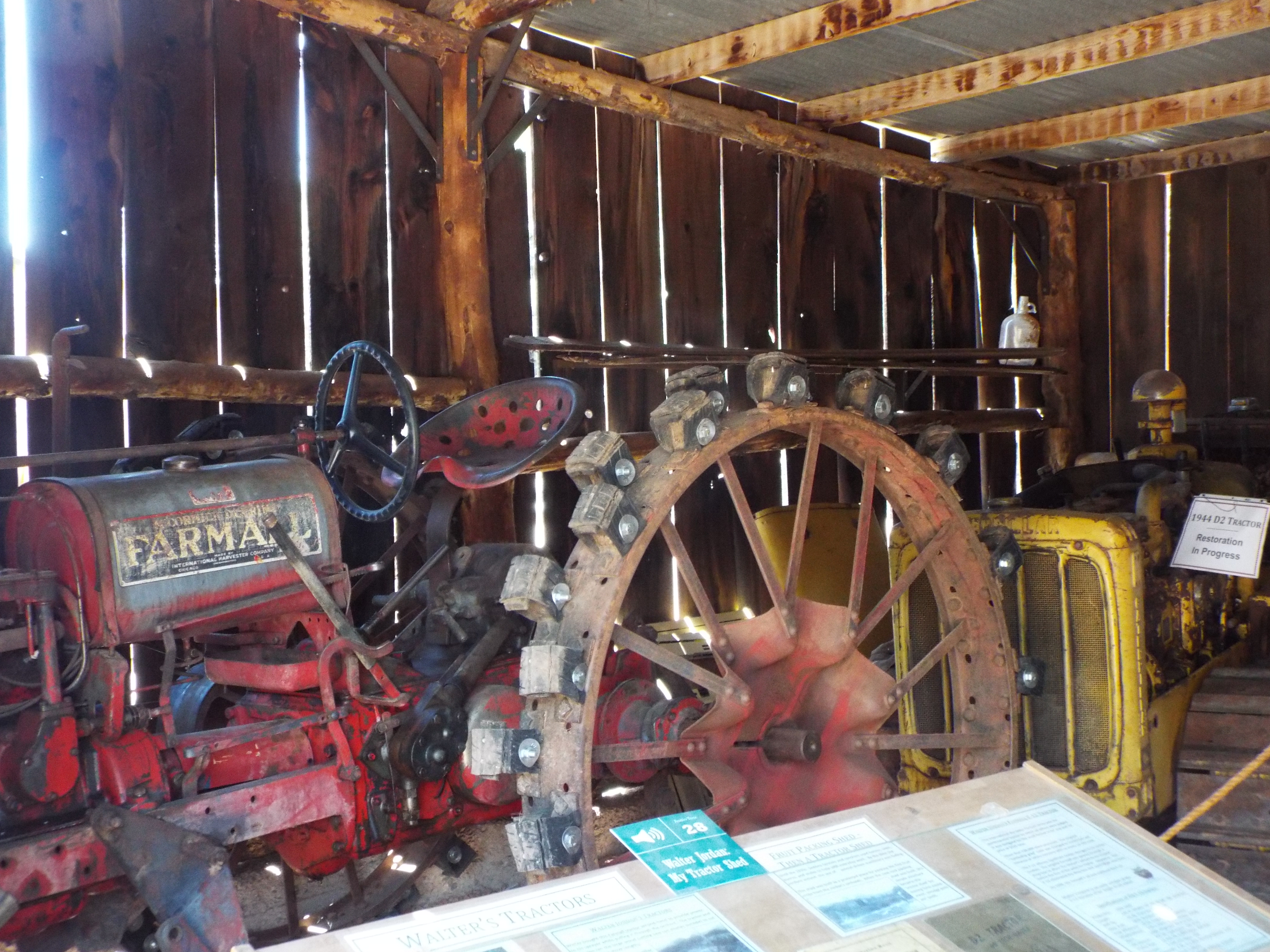
Tractor and farm equipment

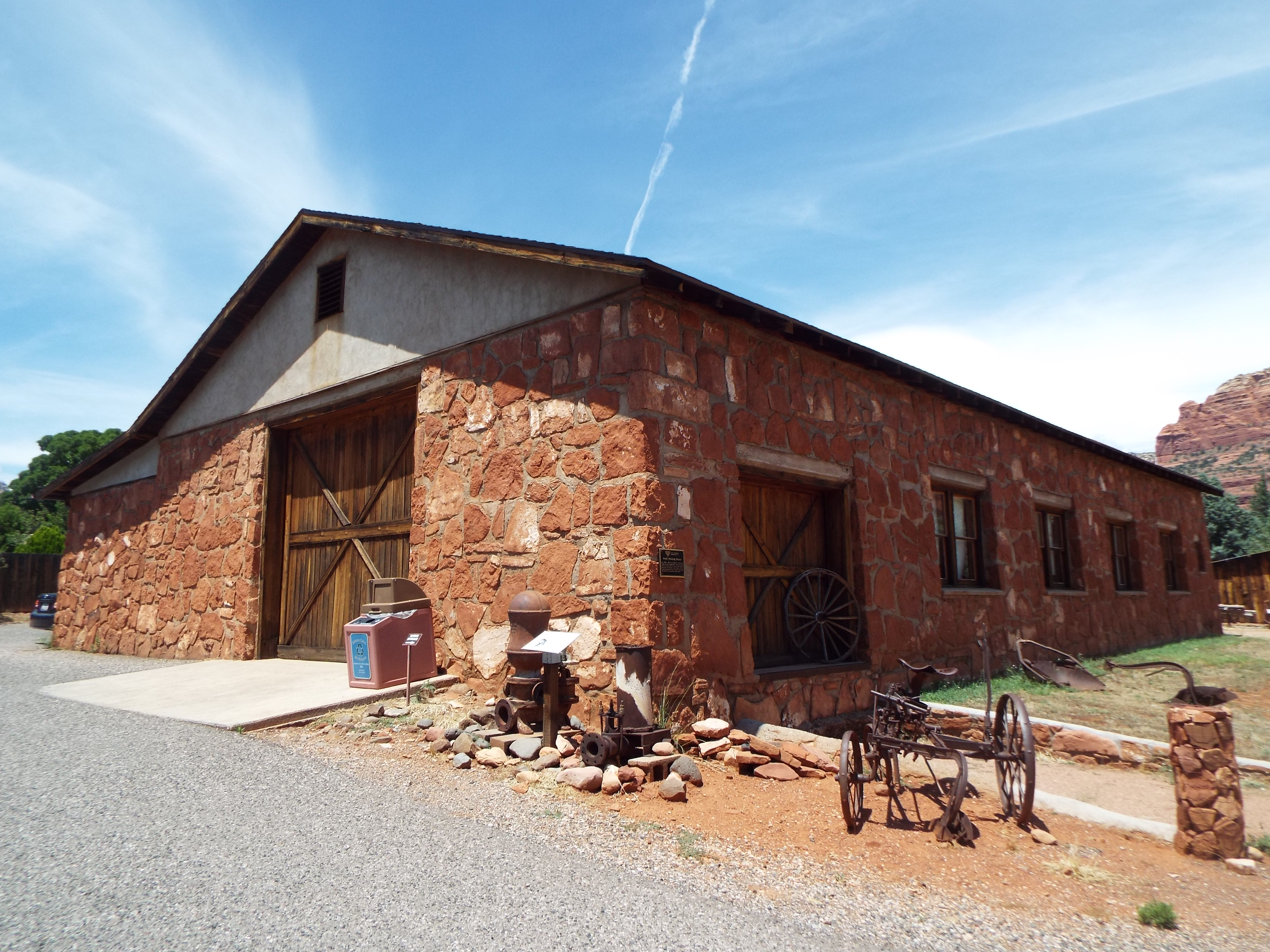
Fruit Packing House

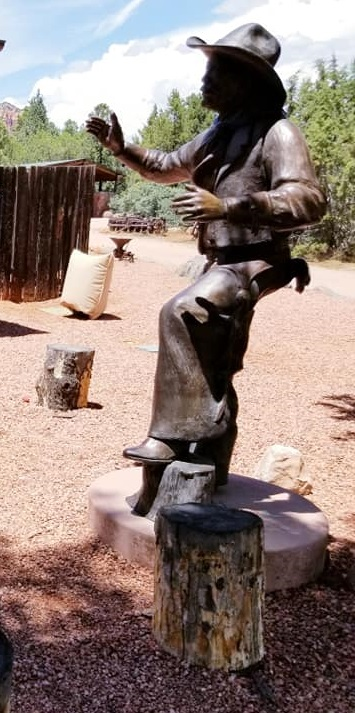
The Storytellin' Cowboy

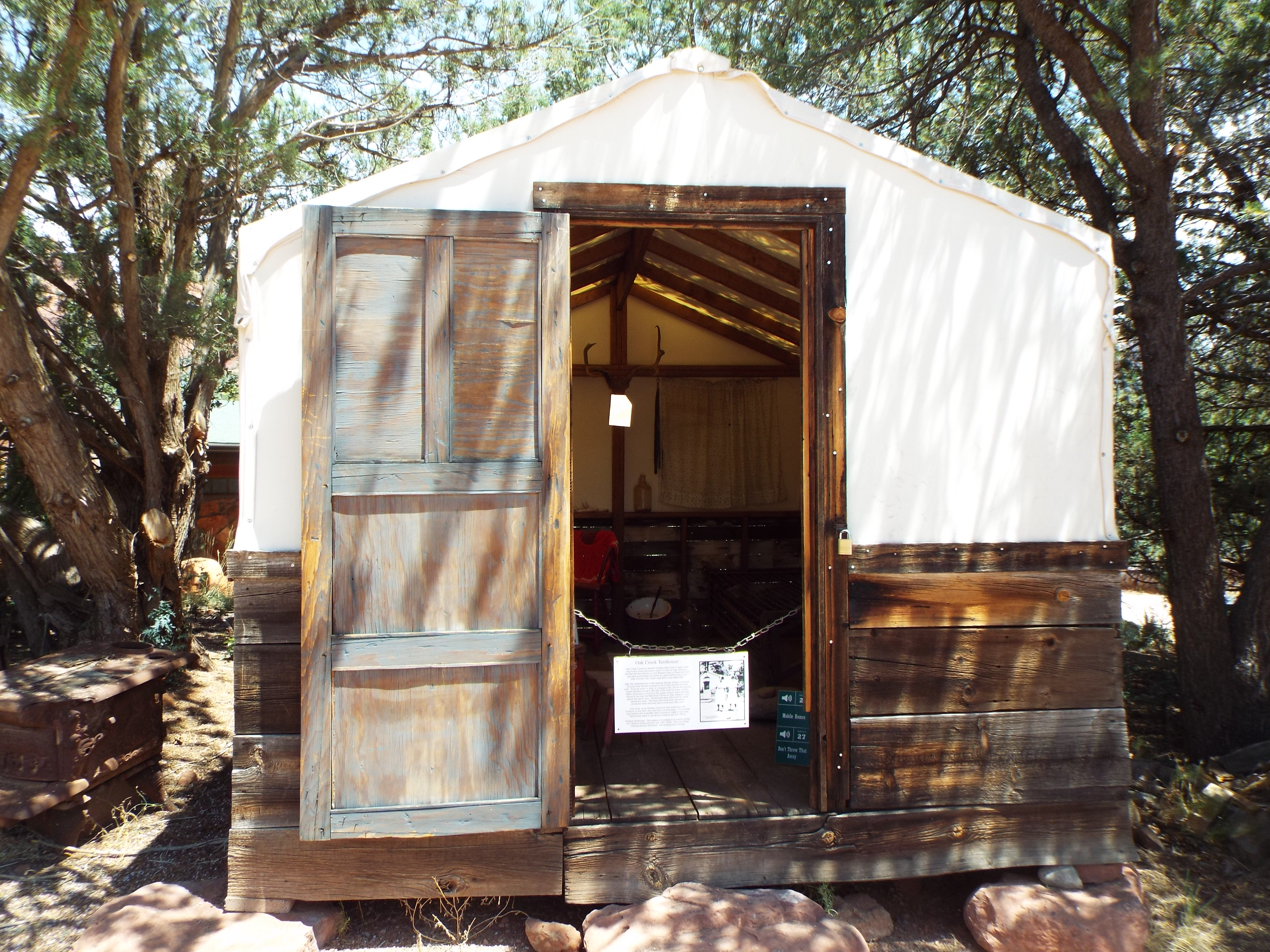
Oak Creek Tenthouse

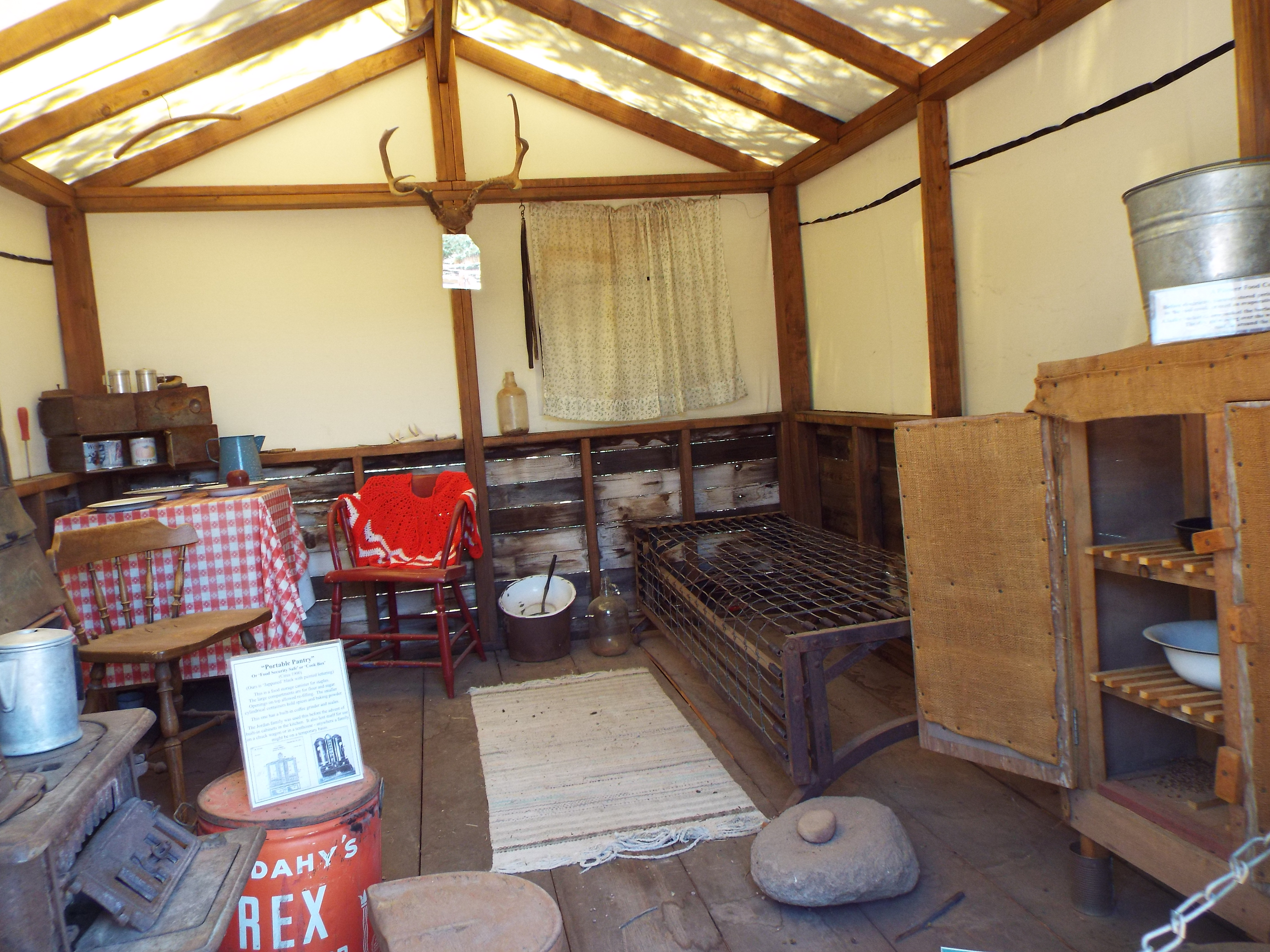
Inside the Oak Creek Tenthouse

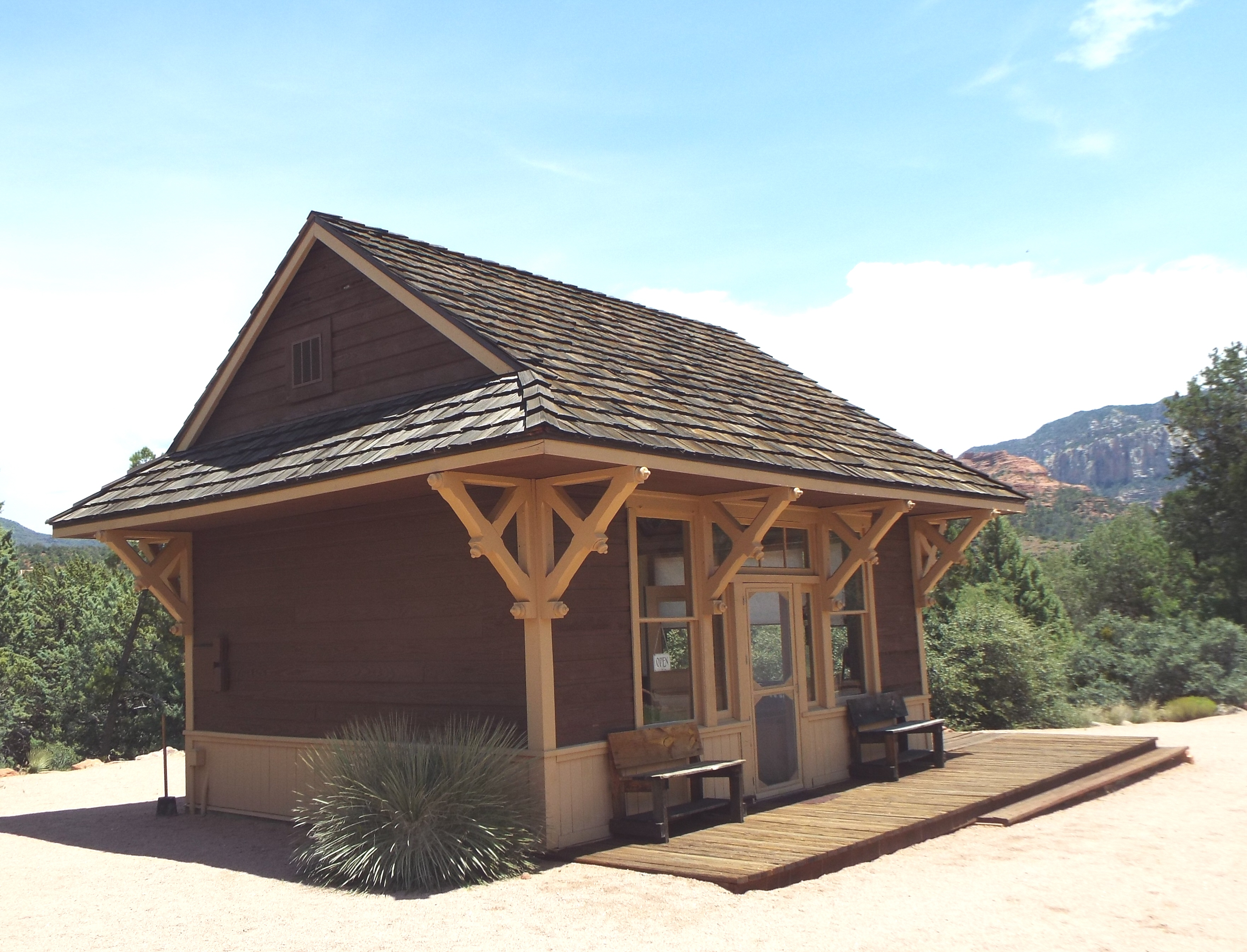
Winona Railroad Station and Telegraph office

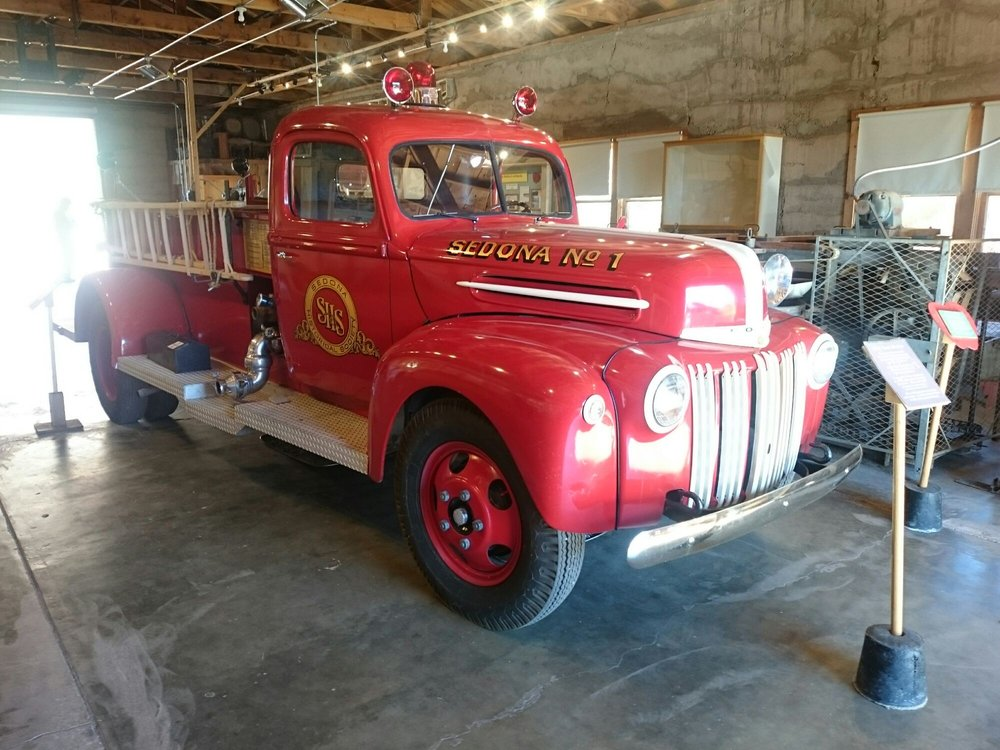
Sedona's Fire truck #1 a 1942 Ford-Maxim.

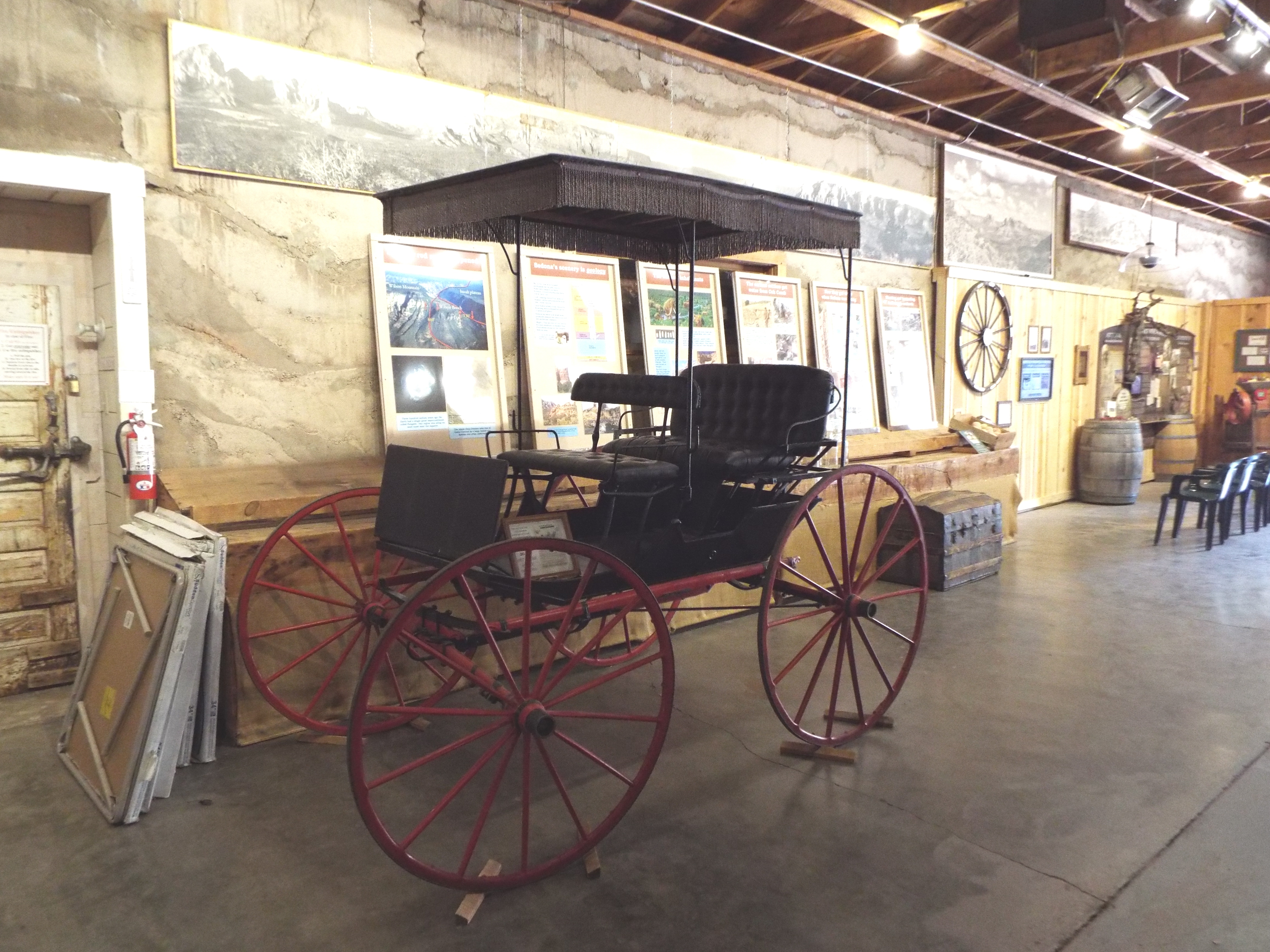
1902 Horse Drawn Carriage

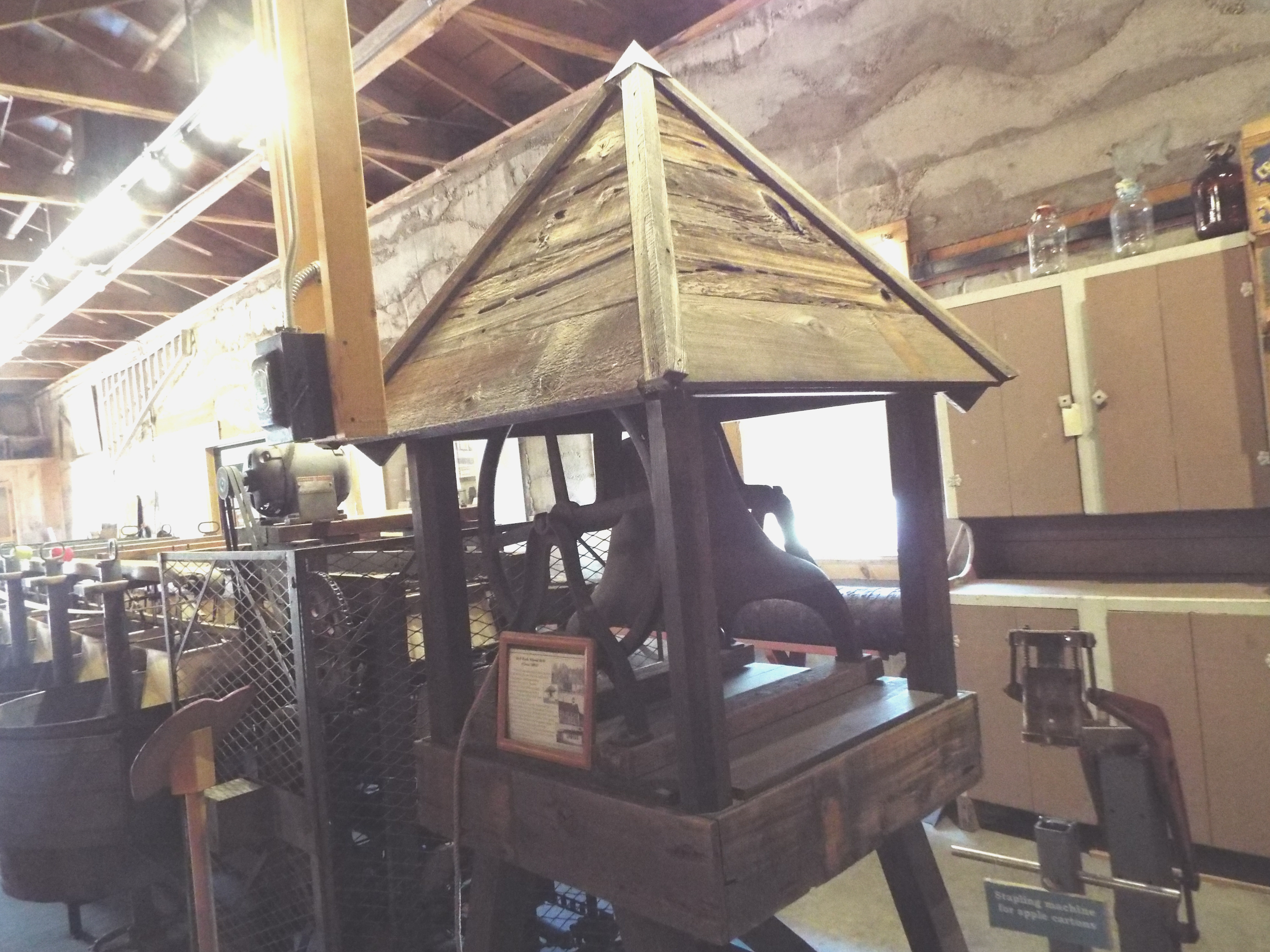
Old School Bell

== Cooks Cedar Glade Cemetery ==
The Cooks Cedar Glade Cemetery – The cemetery was established in 1933 by Henry Elmer Cook as part of his 160-acre homestead. It is located at 115 Airport Rd. The Pioneers' Cemetery Association (PCA) defines an "historic cemetery" as one which has been in existence for more than fifty years. Many members of Sedona's pioneer families are buried there including the city's namesake, Sedona Schnebly.

Cooks Cedar Glade Cemetery

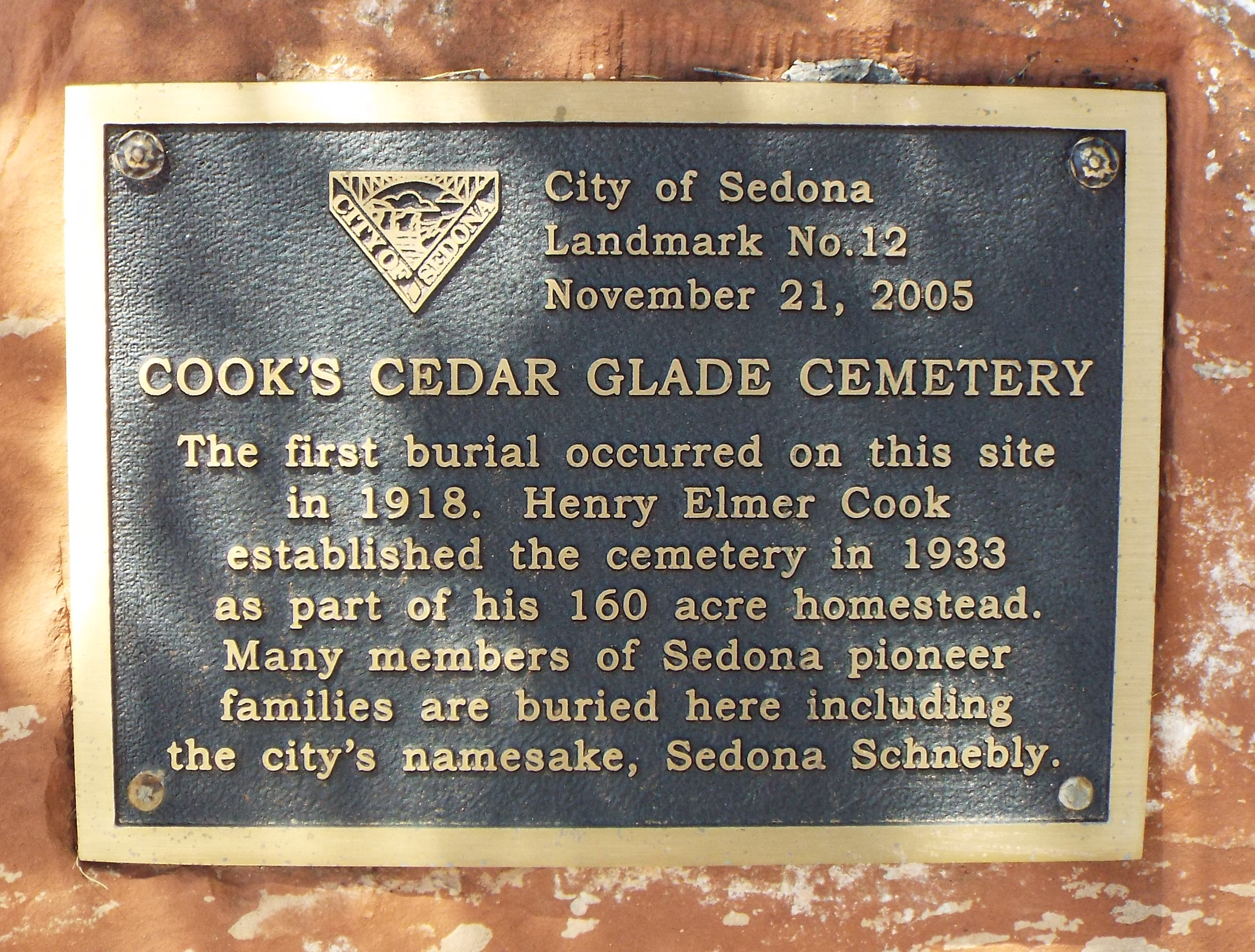
Cooks Cedar Glade Cemetery marker

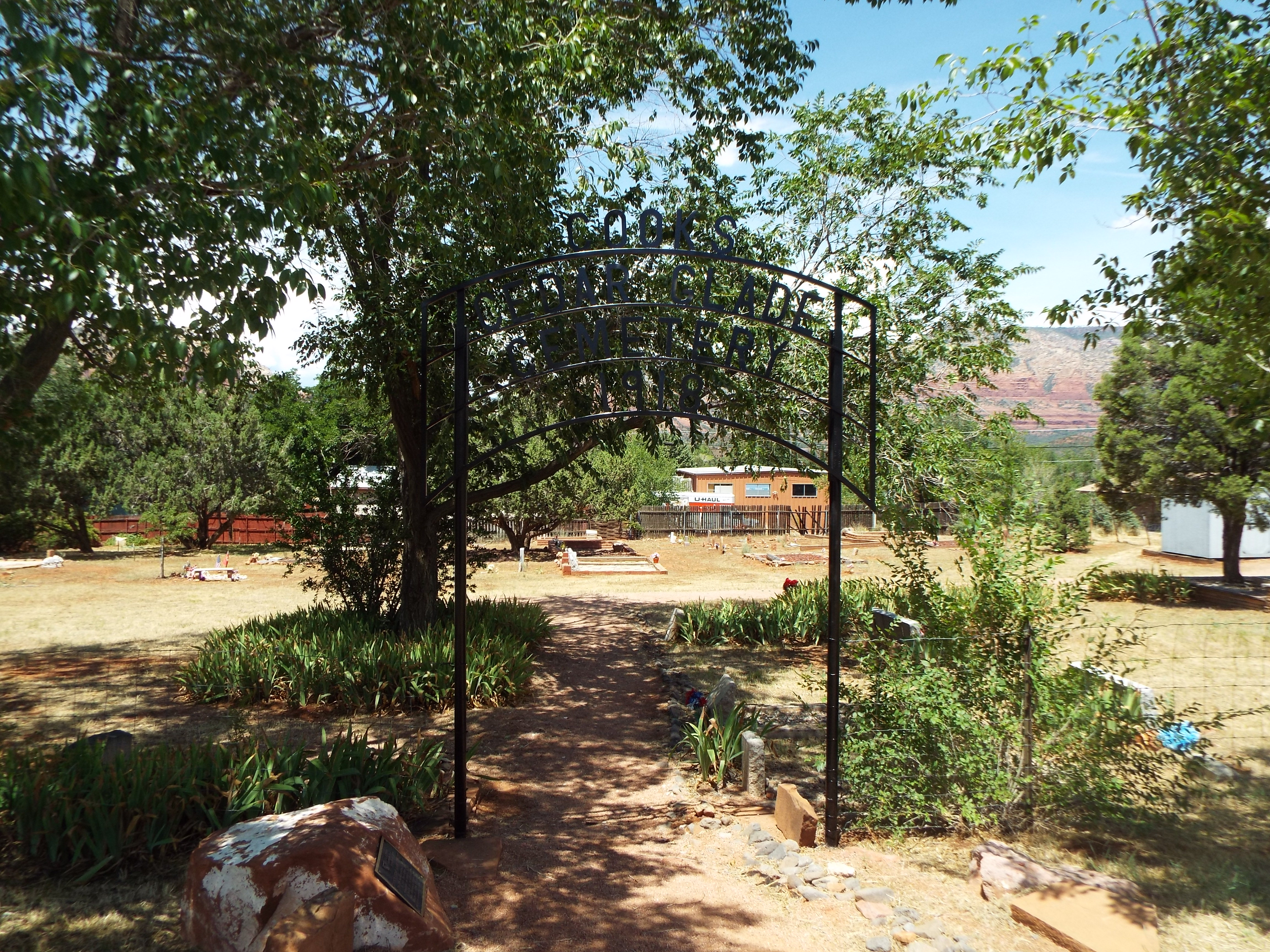
Cooks Cedar Glade Cemetery entrance

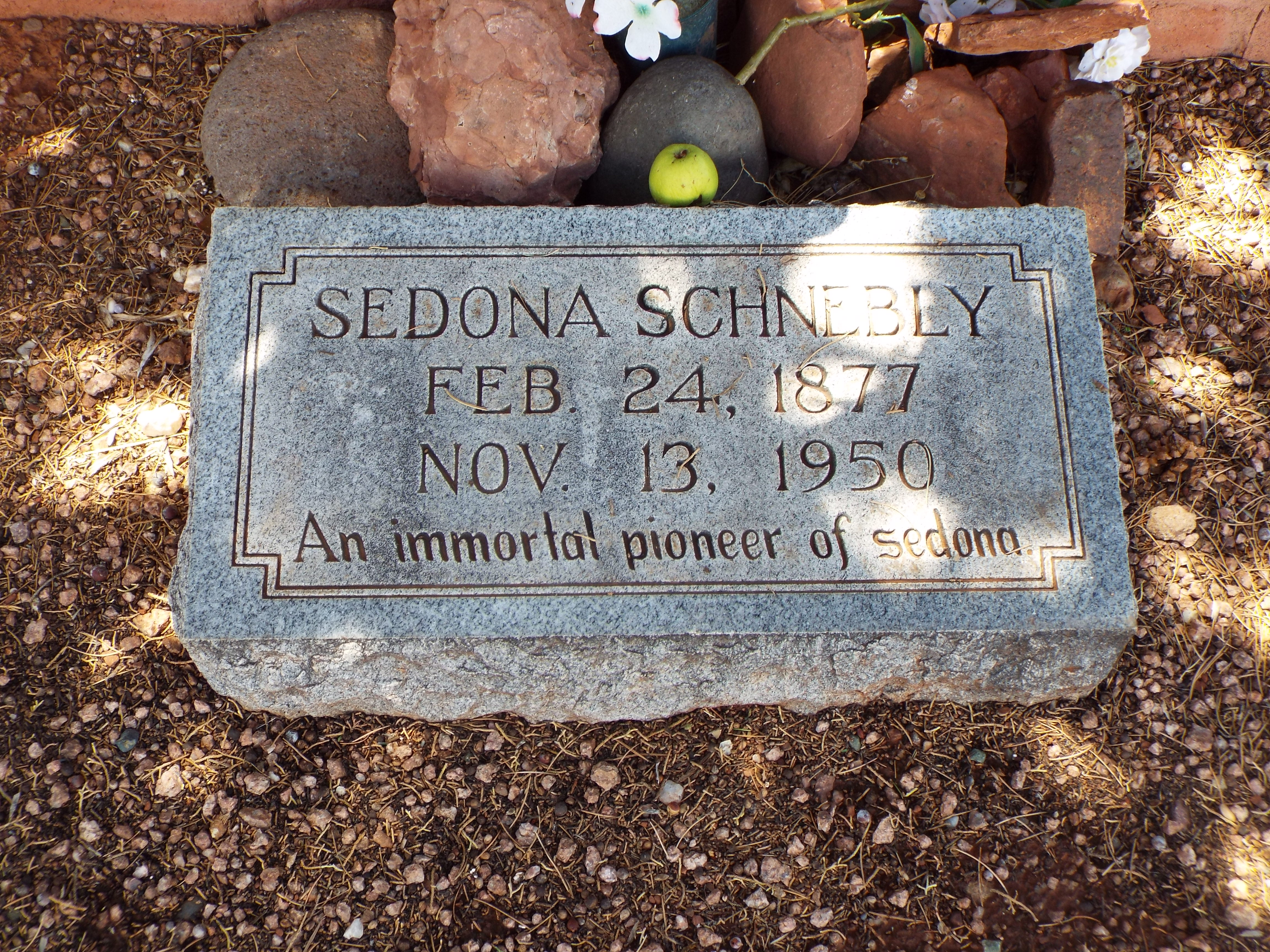
Grave-site of Sedona Schnebly (1877–1950)

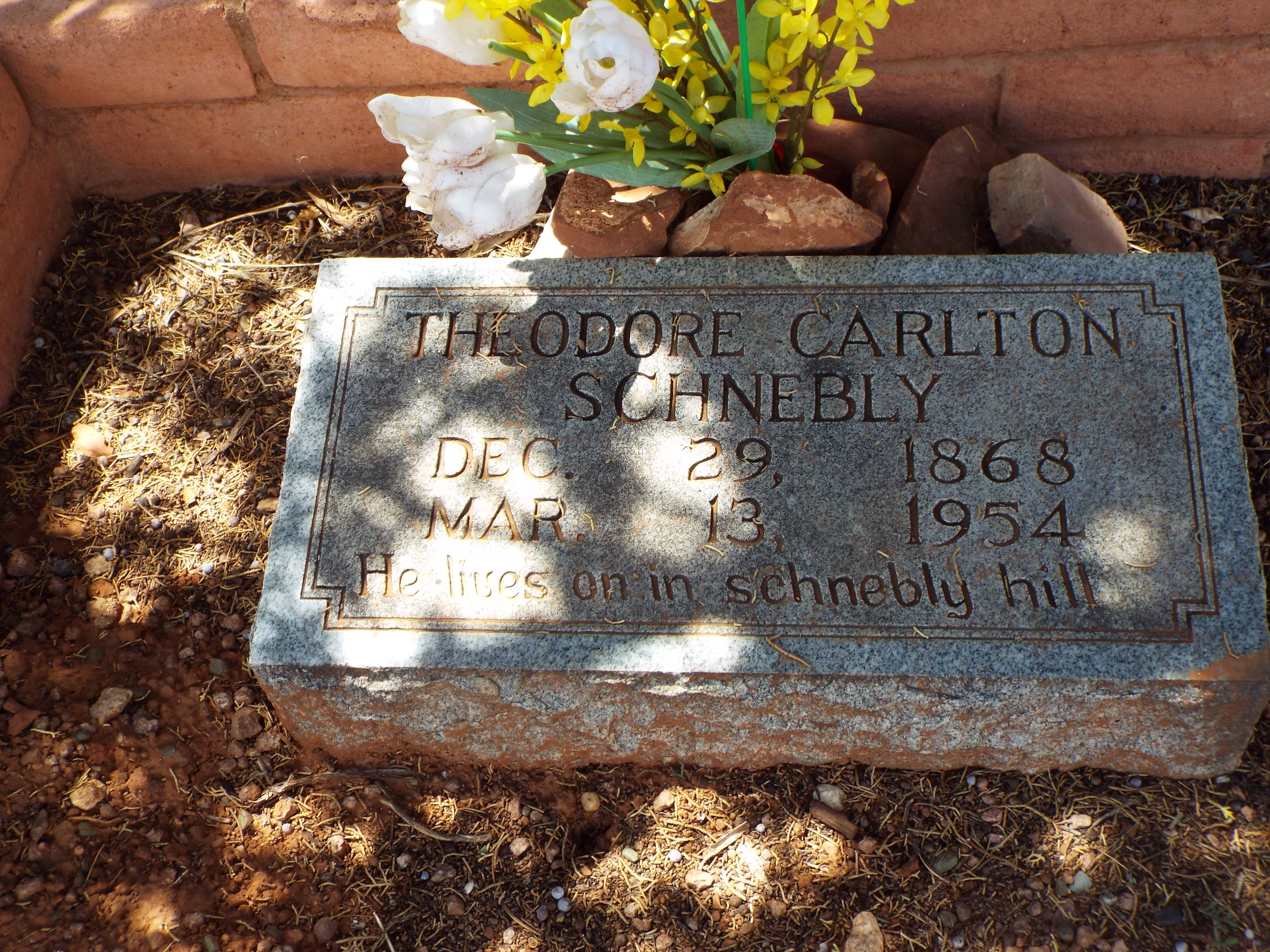
Grave-site of Theodore Carlton Schnebly (1868–1954)

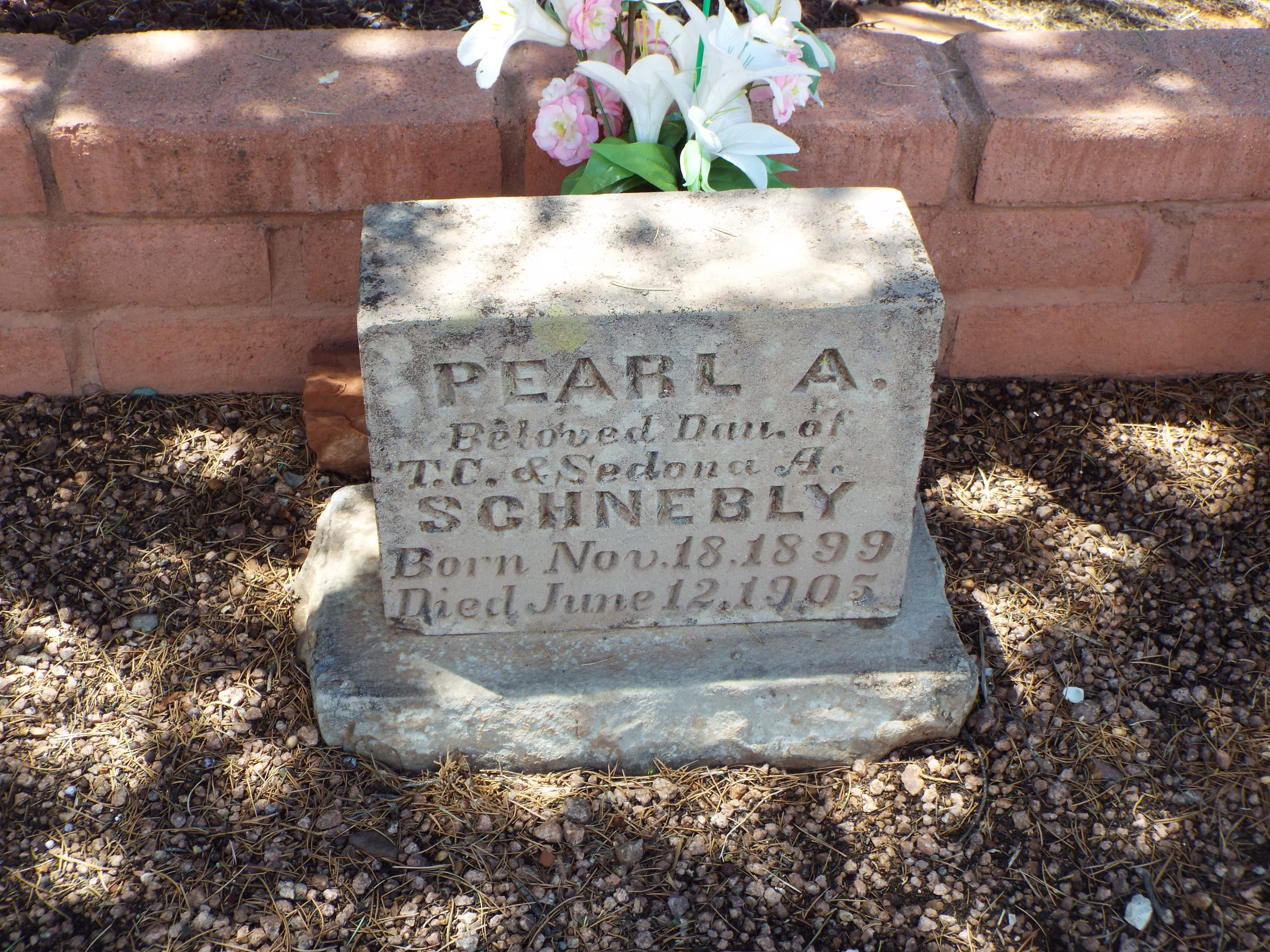
Grave-site of Pearl Azalea Schnebly (1899–1905)

== See also ==
- National Register of Historic Places listings in Coconino County, Arizona
