= Canon de 16 Gribeauval =

Service history
- Used by: France
- Wars: French Revolutionary Wars; Napoleonic Wars

Production history
- Designer: Jean Baptiste Vaquette de Gribeauval

Specifications
- Mass: 2,000 kg
- Barrel length: 336 cm
- Caliber: 133.7 mm

The Canon de 16 Gribeauval was a French cannon and part of the Gribeauval system developed by Jean Baptiste Vaquette de Gribeauval. It was part of the siege artillery.

The canon de 16 Gribeauval was used extensively during the wars following the French Revolution, as well as the Napoleonic Wars.

Some of the earlier Gribeauval siege guns kept the baroque "dolphin" design for the handles.
