= Gribeauval system =

French artillery system

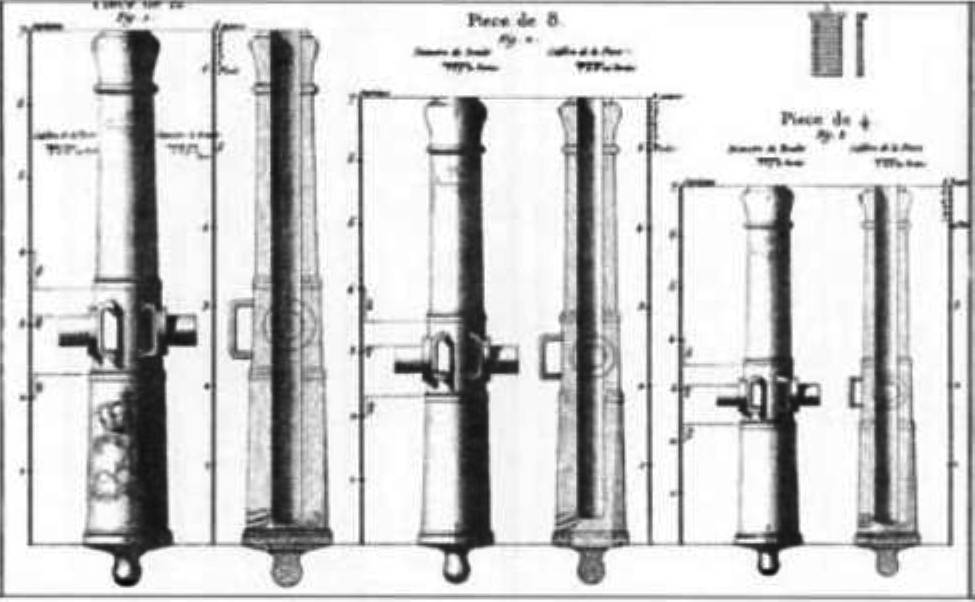
- Gribeauval system field artillery gun barrels are shown. From left to right, they are 12-, 8-, and 4-pounders.
- Type: Artillery
- Place of origin: Kingdom of France; French First Republic; First French Empire

Service history
- In service: 1765–1829
- Used by: France, French satellites
- Wars: American Revolutionary War; French Revolutionary Wars; Napoleonic Wars

Production history
- Designer: Jean Baptiste Vaquette de Gribeauval
- Designed: 15 October 1765

The Gribeauval system (French: système Gribeauval, pronounced [sistɛm ɡʁiboval]) was an artillery system introduced by Lieutenant General Jean Baptiste Vaquette de Gribeauval during the 18th century. This system revolutionized French cannons, with a new production system that allowed lighter, more uniform guns without sacrificing range. The Gribeauval system superseded the Vallière system beginning in 1765. The new guns contributed to French military victories during the French Revolutionary Wars and Napoleonic Wars. The system included improvements to cannons, howitzers, and mortars. The Year XI system partly replaced the field guns in 1803 and the Valée system completely superseded the Gribeauval system in 1829.

== Development ==
The mid-18th century saw the development of mobile field artillery. Ballistics engineers and metallurgy technicians introduced reforms that lowered the weight of gun tubes while other experts devised lighter gun carriages. Gun calibers were standardized, easing the logistical headache caused by a multitude of calibers. Gribeauval was a veteran combat officer and an able artillery theoretician. With the advent of the Gribeauval system, the French enjoyed the best artillery in Europe. One historian called it "arguably the best artillery system in Europe at that time".

Benjamin Robins put artillery on a scientific basis in 1742. Bronze, an alloy of 10 parts copper to one part tin, was preferred for cannons because it was lighter than iron and more durable. At that time, cannons were cast hollow around a core and the core often moved within the mold, producing an imperfect bore. This problem was solved at The Hague foundry in 1747. Jean Maritz began casting guns as a single, solid block, and then drilling the bore on a large machine. The Dutch tried to maintain the secret, but the new process soon became widely known in Europe. After Maritz's invention, a cannon could be manufactured with a better-aligned bore and tighter tolerances. This resulted in less windage – the gap between the cannonball and the bore – which meant less gas pressure escaped, so that smaller gunpowder charges could hurl the projectile farther and more accurately. When less gunpowder could be used to achieve the same power and range, the ballistics experts found that cannon barrels could be made thinner, shorter, and lighter.

The army of the Habsburg monarchy discovered that its artillery was outmatched by Prussian cannons during the War of the Austrian Succession. In 1744, the new Director General Joseph Wenzel I, Prince of Liechtenstein began a series of reforms to improve the design of Austria's field artillery and provide training to its gunners. By the start of the Seven Years' War, the Austrians had introduced the Liechtenstein artillery system which upgraded their artillery with lighter cannons and introduced a very good howitzer. These were so successful that other nations rushed to manufacture similar weapons. Russia introduced the Shuvalov system in 1757. Gribeauval, who served in the Austrian artillery in 1756–1762, got a first-hand look at the new field guns. Upon his return to France, Gribeauval was requested to reorganize the artillery.

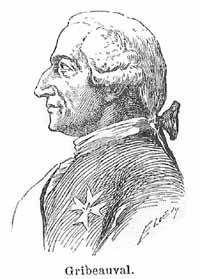
Gribeauval

France already possessed the only unified range of artillery in Europe. Earlier, Florent-Jean de Vallière standardized guns from 4-pounders through 24-pounders in the Vallière system. However, the cannons were all very heavy. The Gribeauval system was introduced through royal order on 15 October 1765. The new system was strenuously resisted by Vallière's son, Joseph Florent de Vallière and other officers. Because of their opposition, the Gribeauval system was not completely implemented until 1776. The 1-pounder Rostaing gun and the Swedish 4-pounder battalion guns were retained from the previous system.

Gribeauval's reforms encompassed not only the cannons but also the gun carriages, limbers, ammunition chests, and the accompanying tools. The system's field guns included 4-, 8-, and 12-pounder cannons and 6- and 8-inch howitzers. The gun barrels were cast shorter and thinner, while gun carriages were built lighter and narrower. These improvements dramatically reduced the weight of an artillery piece. The carriages were standardized and built with interchangeable parts. The carriages had two positions for the trunnions, a forward position for firing and a rear position for traveling. The draft horses were harnessed in pairs, rather than single file. The guns were fitted with a rear calibrated gunsight and an elevating screw. The last two improvements allowed gunners to more easily aim the cannons.

The new system incorporated other innovations that were widely shared in Europe. One was the quick-match tube which generated a better ignition of the gunpowder charge. Other general improvements were the adoption of gunpowder charges in pre-packaged flannel bags, a more effective gunpowder mixture, and the use of a vent-pricker – a special tool to make a hole in the gunpowder bags. Around 1791, the French chemist Nicholas Leblanc invented a process to manufacture soda ash, allowing to more cheaply convert calcium nitrate from guano to saltpeter, a necessary ingredient of gunpowder. Finally, since better gunners were needed to operate the new field pieces, France set up artillery schools to train its soldiers.

== Gun types ==
=== Field guns ===
The Gribeauval field artillery pieces were approximately half the weight of the Vallière guns of the same caliber, without sacrificing range.

- Canon de 12 Gribeauval – 12-pounder cannon
- Canon de 8 Gribeauval – 8-pounder cannon
- Canon de 4 Gribeauval – 4-pounder cannon
- Obusier de 6 pouces Gribeauval – 6-inch howitzer

No Gribeauval guns were shipped to the American forces during the American Revolutionary War. However, it is probable that the French forces employed Gribeauval siege cannons during that conflict.

Note that the Old French pound (livre) was approximately one-tenth heavier than the English pound. Also, the Old French inch (pouce) was slightly longer than the English inch. Therefore, the French guns threw somewhat heavier shot and shell than the same-rated English and American guns, so that a French 8-pounder was similar in power to a British 9-pounder.

Gribeauval field gun calibers, crews, ranges, rates of fire, and ammunition carried
Name	Gun calibre	Gun crew	Canister range	Effective range shot	Maximum range shot	Rate of Fire per minute	Trail Chest round shot	Caisson round shot	Caisson canister shot	Caissons per gun
12-pounder cannon	121 mm (4.8 in)	15	575 m (629 yd)	900 m (980 yd)	1,800 m (2,000 yd)	1 shot	9	48	20	3
8-pounder cannon	100 mm (3.9 in)	13	475 m (519 yd)	800 m (870 yd)	1,500 m (1,600 yd)	2 shots	15	62	20	2
4-pounder cannon	84 mm (3.3 in)	8	375 m (410 yd)	700 m (770 yd)	1,200 m (1,300 yd)	2–3 shots	18	100	50	1
6-inch howitzer	166 mm (6.5 in)	13	200 m (220 yd)	700 m (770 yd)	1,200 m (1,300 yd)	1 shell	4	49	11	3

The historian Gunther E. Rothenberg published a table giving similar numbers except that it listed 30 caisson-carried canister rounds for the 8-pounder and three rounds of canister for the 6-inch howitzer. Scotty Bowden and Charlie Tarbox gave canister shot ranges in meters as 600 for the 12-pounder, 550 for the 8-pounder, 400 for the 4-pounder, and 250 for the 6-inch howitzer. Other ranges were in agreement with the table above. They also listed a Gribeauval 24-pounder howitzer that had a canister range of 300 meters and a maximum range of 1,500 meters.

Gribeauval Field Gun Lengths, Weights, Gunpowder Charge Weights, and No. Balls per Canister Round
Name	Barrel Length	Barrel Weight	Carriage Weight	Round Shot Charge Weight	Large Canister Balls per Round	Small Canister Balls per Round	Canister Round Charge Weight
12-pounder cannon	7 feet 7 inches (2.31 m)	2,172 lb (985.2 kg)	2,192 lb (994.3 kg)	4 lb (1.8 kg)	41	112	4.25 lb (1.9 kg)
8-pounder cannon	6 feet 7 inches (2.01 m)	1,286 lb (583.3 kg)	1,851 lb (839.6 kg)	2.5 lb (1.1 kg)	41	112	2.75 lb (1.2 kg)
4-pounder cannon	5 feet 3 inches (1.60 m)	637 lb (288.9 kg)	1,454 lb (659.5 kg)	1.5 lb (0.7 kg)	41	63	1.75 lb (0.8 kg)
6-inch howitzer	2 feet 4 inches (0.71 m)	701 lb (318.0 kg)	1,895 lb (859.6 kg)	1.0625 lb (0.5 kg)	60	none	not stated

The canister varied in size according to the caliber of the gun. Also, there were two different sizes of balls in the small canister round. The 12-pounder employed 6 ounce balls in large canister rounds and 2 and 3 oz. balls in small canister rounds. The 8-pounder used 4 oz. balls in large canister rounds and 1 and 2 oz. balls in small canister rounds. The 4-pounder had ¾ and 2 oz. balls in small canister rounds. An 8-inch howitzer had a barrel weight of 1,120 lb (508.0 kg) and required a gunpowder charge weighing 1.75 lb (0.8 kg).

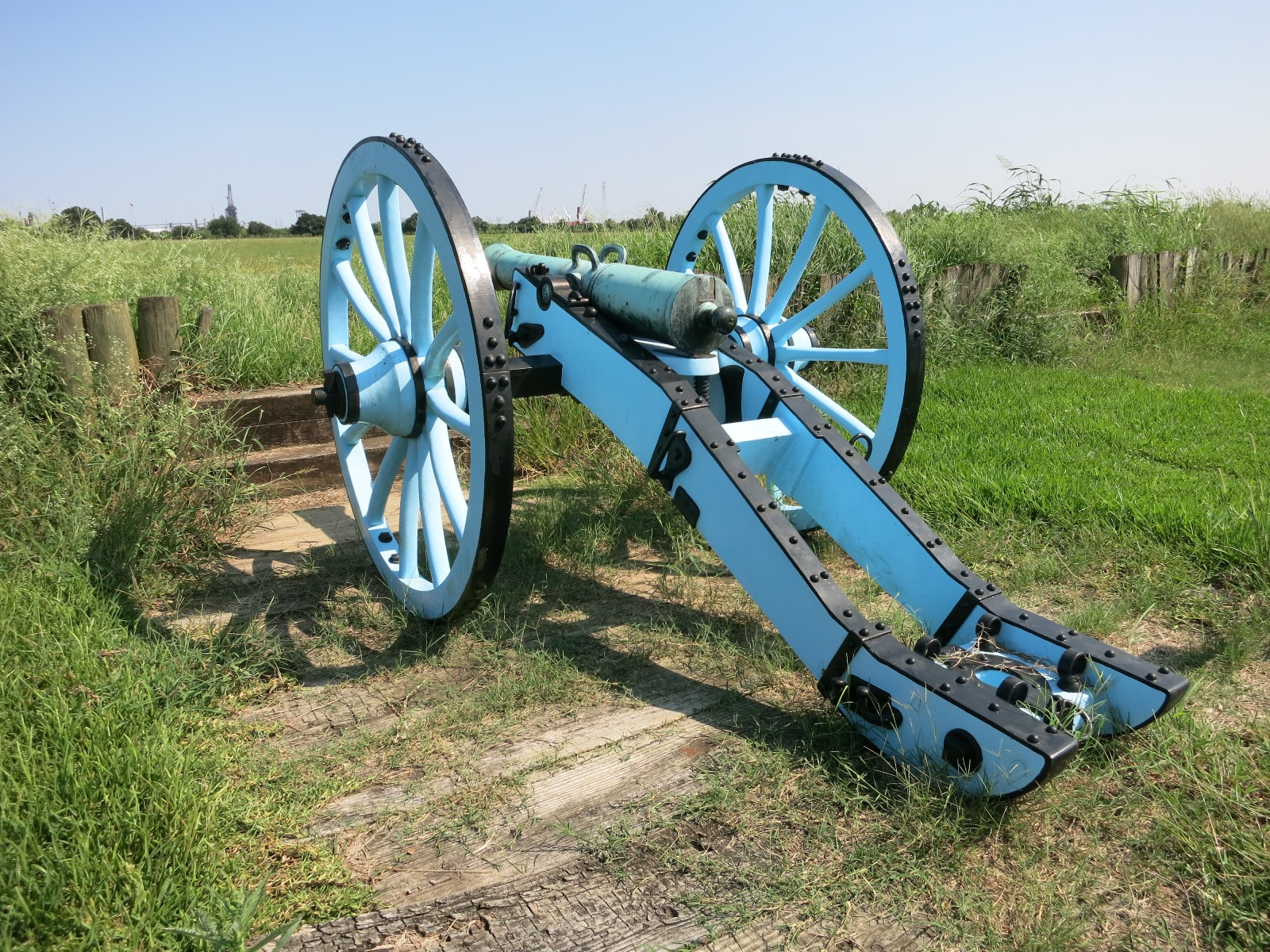
A 4-pounder Gribeauval cannon is sited in Battery 5 at Chalmette National Battlefield in New Orleans, La.

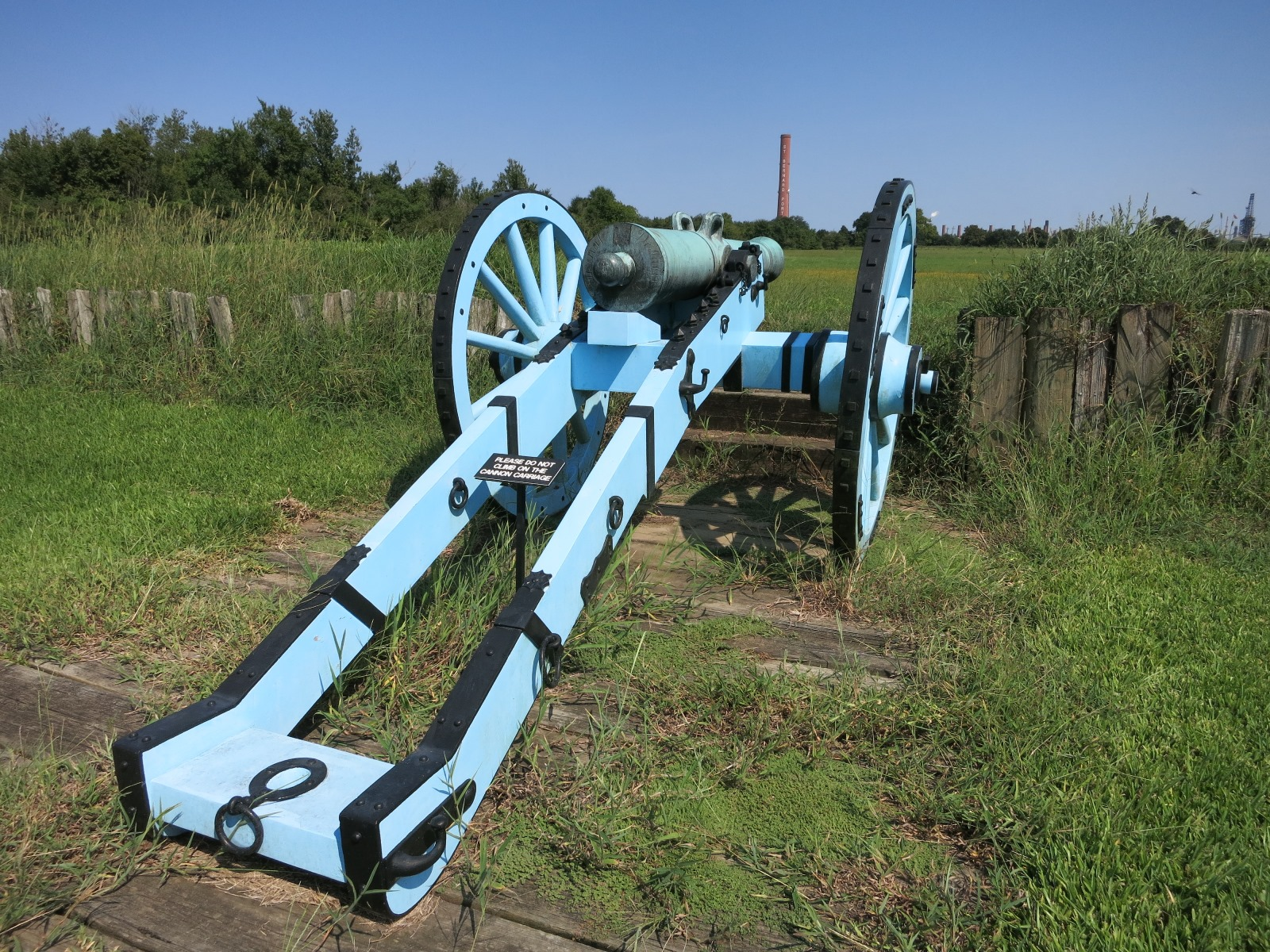
An 8-pounder Gribeauval cannon is sited in Battery 6 at Chalmette National Battlefield in New Orleans, La.

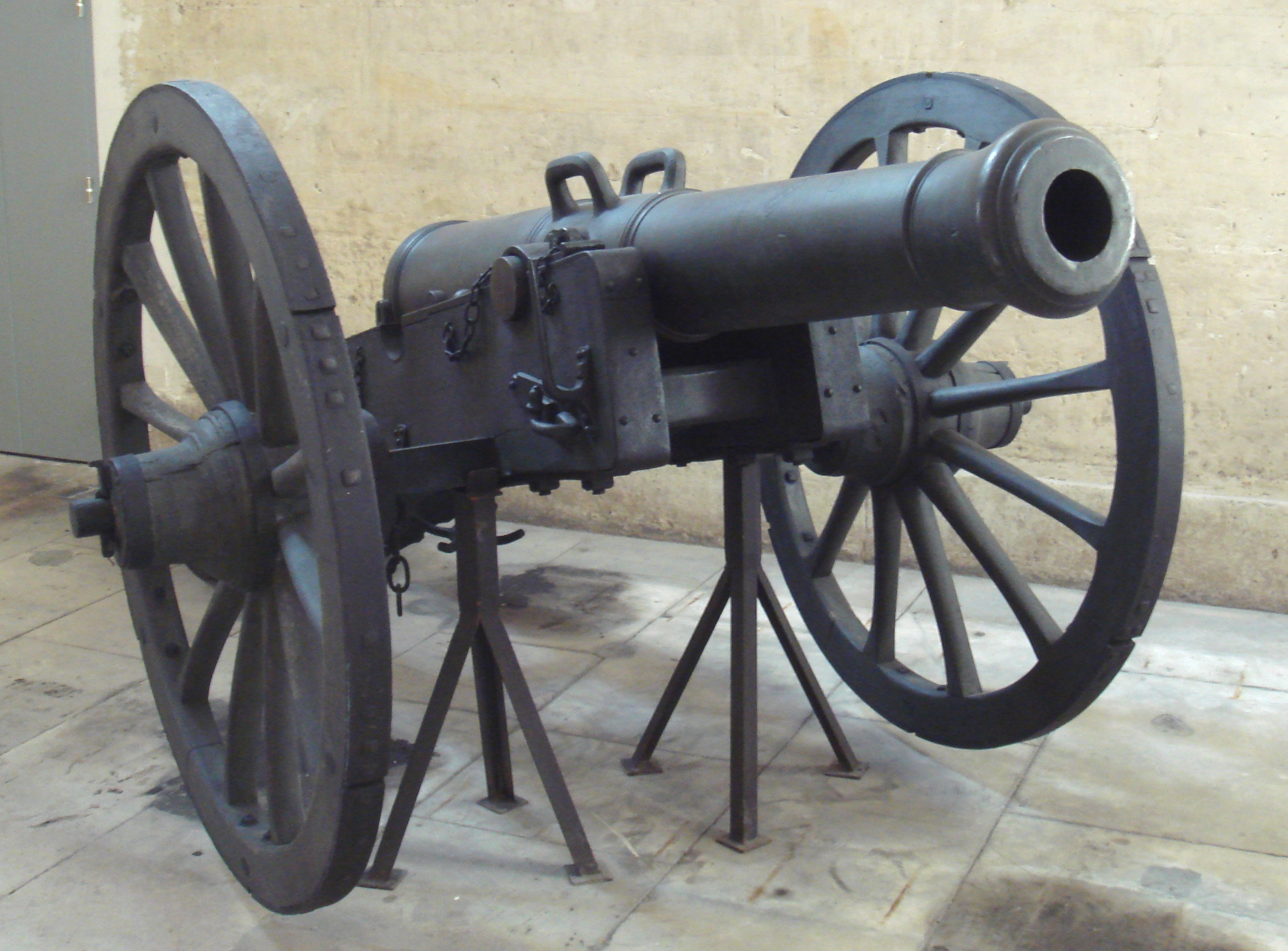
A 12-pounder Gribeauval cannon is located in Les Invalides in Paris, France.

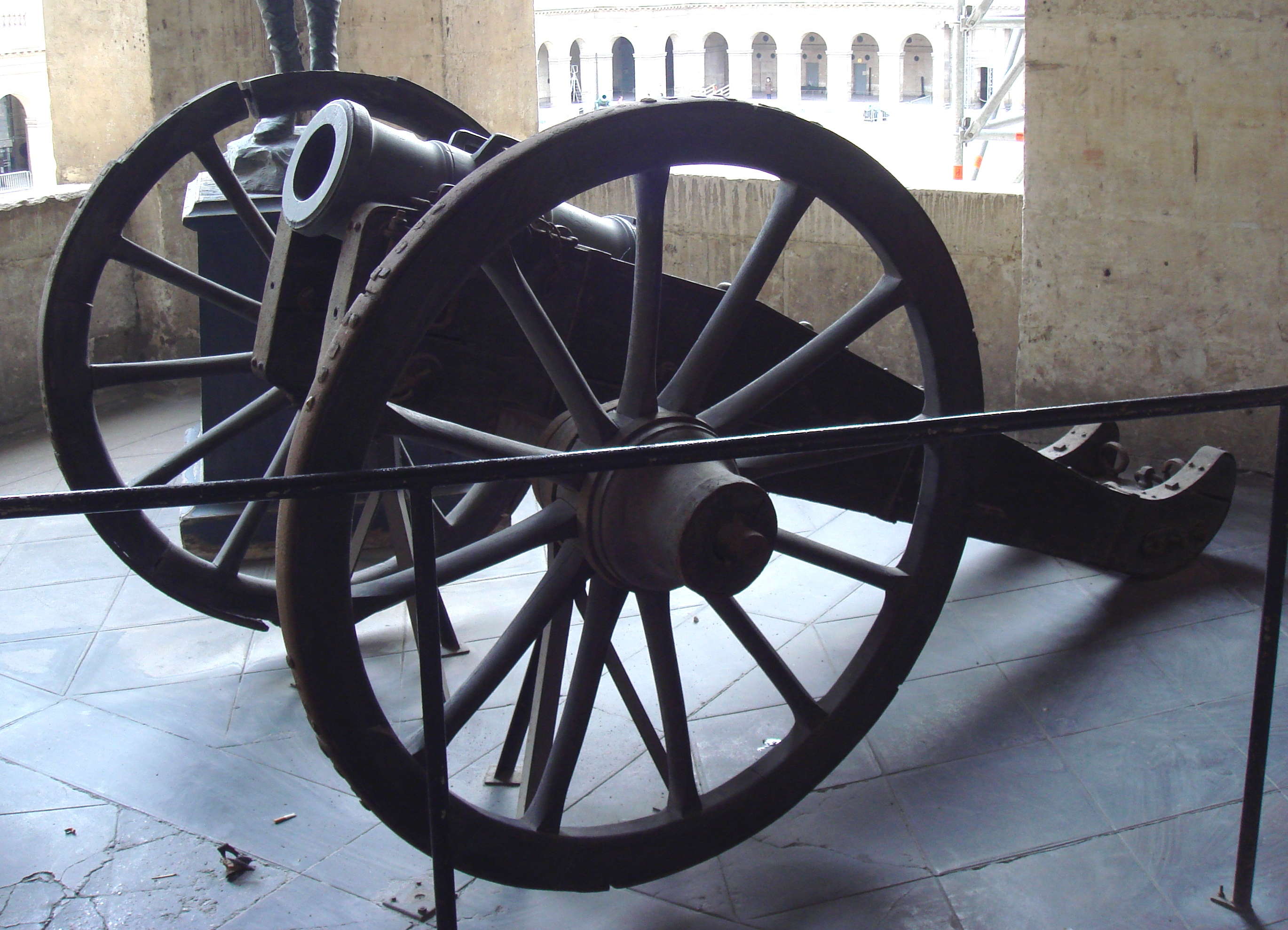
A 6-inch Gribeauval howitzer is located in Les Invalides in Paris, France.

=== Siege and garrison guns ===
For siege and garrison artillery he retained the same proportions as the earlier Vallière System of 1732 but with the removal of the decoration and simplification of the dolphins.

- Canon de 24 Gribeauval – 24-pounder siege cannon
- Canon de 16 Gribeauval – 16-pounder siege cannon
- Canon lourd de 12 Gribeauval – 12-pounder siege cannon
- Canon lourd de 8 Gribeauval – 8-pounder siege cannon

According to one author, only the Gribeauval siege guns were first used for major operations in the American Revolutionary War. They were employed by Jean-Baptiste Donatien de Vimeur, comte de Rochambeau's French expeditionary corps, from 1780 to late 1782, and especially at the Siege of Yorktown in 1781. A second source believed that the Yorktown siege guns were Gribeauval pieces. Rochambeau's siege train included 12 24-pounders, 8 16-pounders, and 16 mortars. A third author stated that it is debatable whether Gribeauval guns were used at Yorktown, though he pointed out that one French source insisted the siege guns were, in fact, Gribeauval guns.

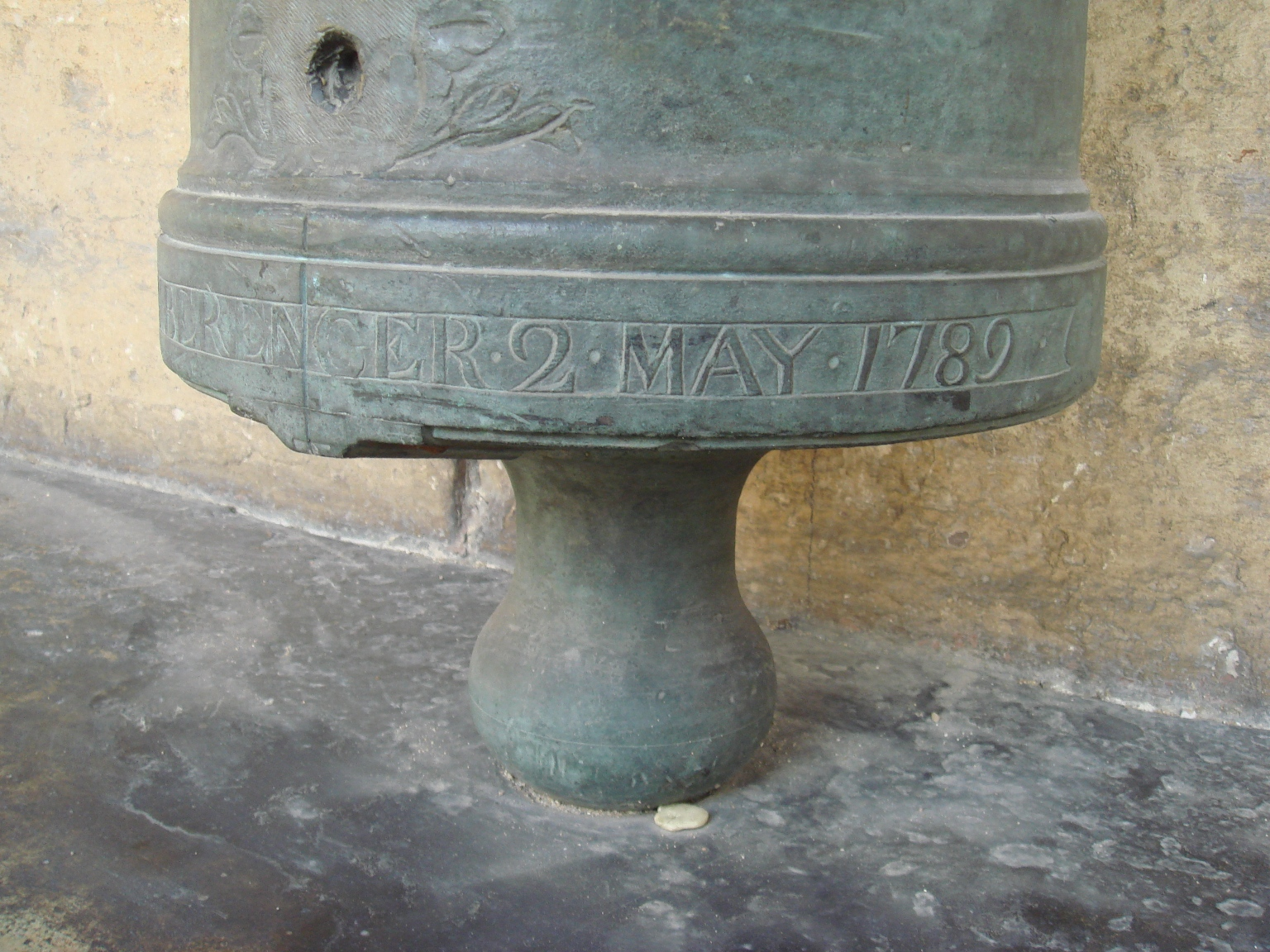
8-pounder heavy Gribeauval cannon

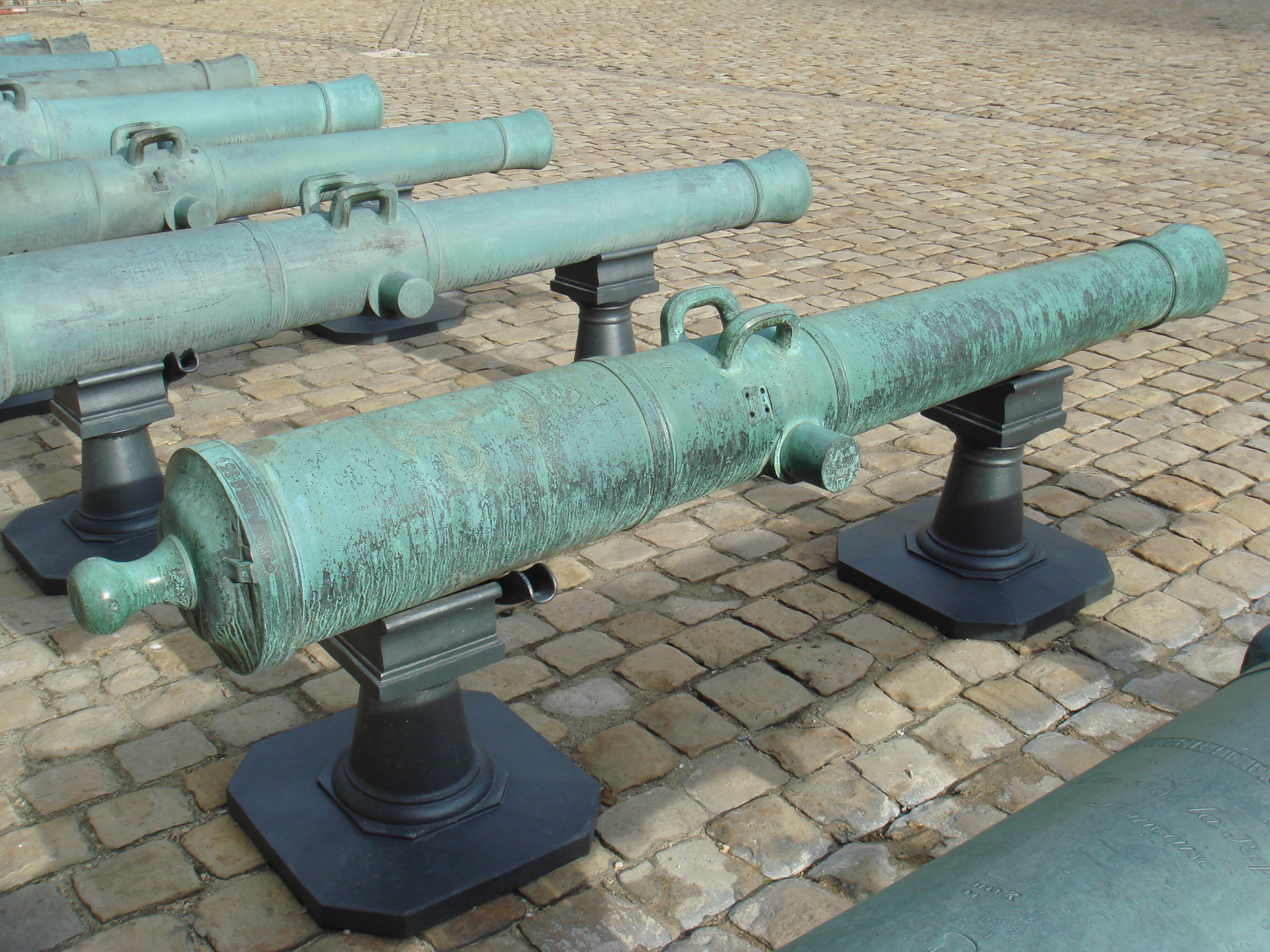
12-pounder heavy Gribeauval cannon

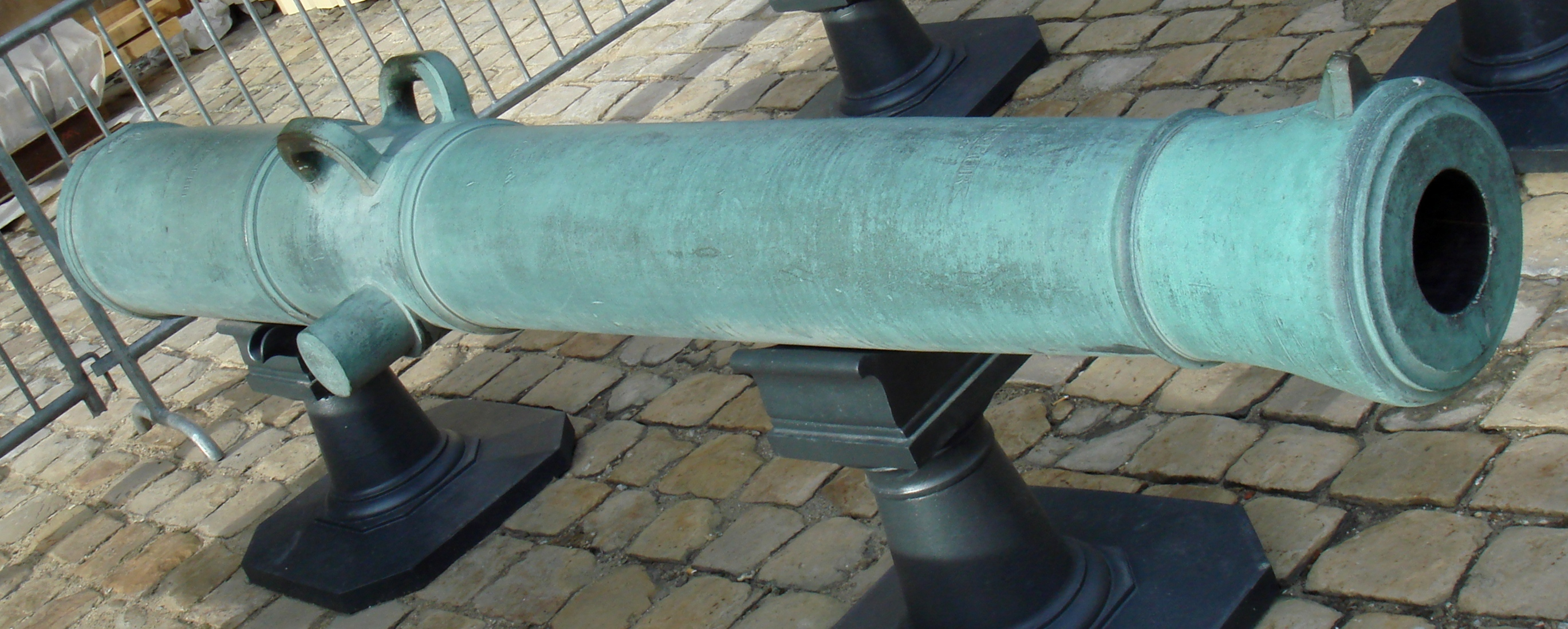
16-pounder Gribeauval cannon

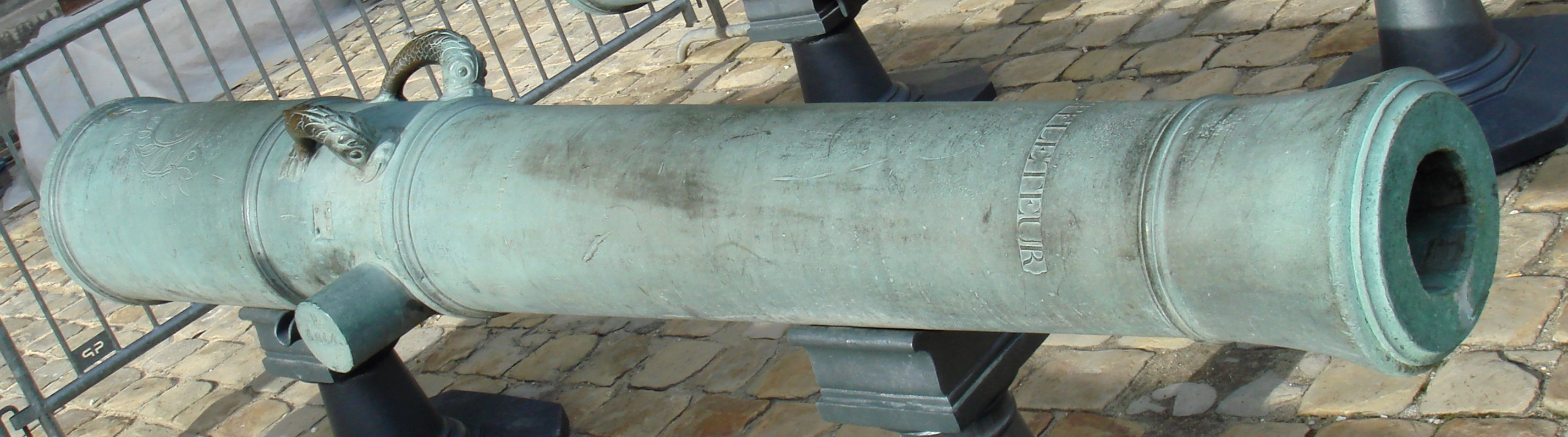
24-pounder Gribeauval cannon

=== Mortars ===
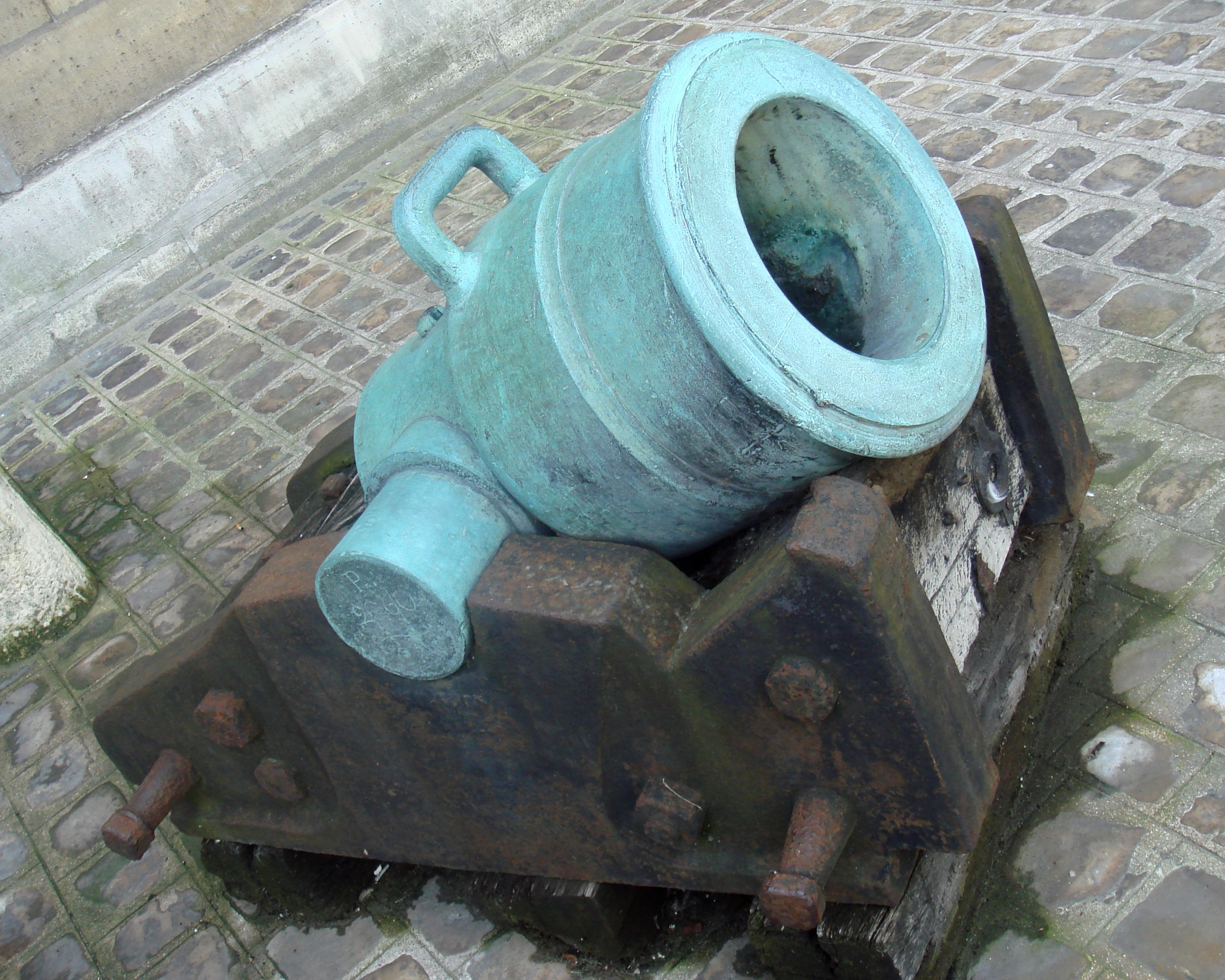
12-inch Gribeauval mortar

Gribeauval also designed a range of mortars, as follows.

- Mortier de 12 Gribeauval – 12-inch mortar
- Mortier court de 10 Gribeauval – Short 10-inch mortar
- Mortier long de 10 Gribeauval – Long 10-inch mortar
- Mortier de 8 Gribeauval – 8-inch mortar

Gribeauval also incorporated in his system an anti-personnel 15-inch stone mortar from the de Vallière system. Mortars and the barrels of 24-pounder siege guns were moved from place to place on special "saddle wagons".

Gribeauval Mortar Specifications
Name	Weight of Mortar	Weight of Carriage	Weight of Charge
12-inch mortar	3,150 lb (1,429 kg)	3,000 lb (1,361 kg)	not stated
Long 10-inch mortar	2,050 lb (930 kg)	2,616 lb (1,187 kg)	6.5 lb (2.9 kg)
Short 10-inch mortar	1,600 lb (726 kg)	1,739 lb (789 kg)	3.5 lb (1.6 kg)
8-inch mortar	550 lb (249 kg)	820 lb (372 kg)	1.25 lb (0.6 kg)

== History ==
In the early years of the French Revolutionary Wars, the artillery arm lost the fewest officers by emigration. That was because many of its officers came from middle-class instead of aristocratic families. Thanks to the Gribeauval system, the French field artillery was Europe's finest. The artillerists had to rely on hired civilian drivers and horses to carry their guns into battle. This problem was not rectified until shortly after 1800, when the drivers became soldiers. At the Battle of Jemappes in 1792, the French superiority in artillery contributed to the victory. The commanding general Charles François Dumouriez remarked that French soldiers were more impetuous when their guns dominated the enemy, and that when the artillery was not successful, the infantry hung back. Historian Ramsay Weston Phipps noted that the French artillery in the War of the First Coalition was "excellent" and helped overcome some of the failings of the new armies. After the Battle of Wattignies in 1793, one Allied observer wrote that the French victory was due to "their immense artillery".

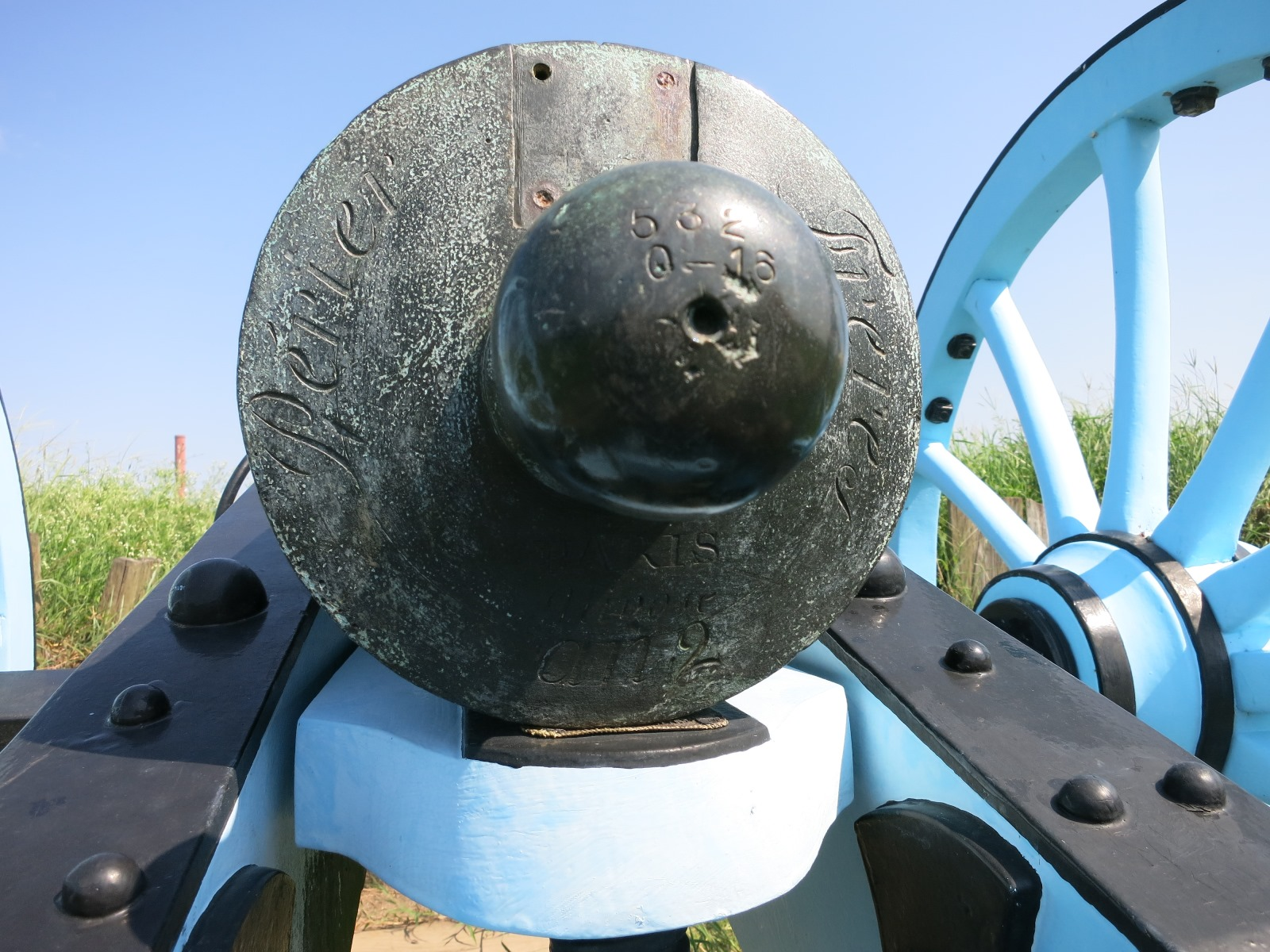
Inscription on the breech of the 4-pounder at Chalmette National Battlefield in New Orleans reads "Périer Frères PARIS Nivose An 2" (21 Dec. 1793–19 Jan. 1794).

For his expert handling of the artillery at the Siege of Toulon in 1793, Napoleon Bonaparte was promoted to general of brigade and began his climb to fame and political power. When Napoleon became First Consul and later emperor, he appointed Auguste de Marmont to carry out most of his artillery improvements. Already in 1800, there were eight foot and six horse artillery regiments, two sapper battalions, and eight battalions of artillery train soldiers, for a total of 28,000 gunners, sappers, and drivers. At first, each infantry unit was allocated some 4-pounders, the so-called regimental artillery. These were suppressed in 1800 but reinstated in 1809 as the infantry declined in quality. Napoleon decided to replace the 4-pounders with 6-pounders in order to increase his artillery's hitting power. This would utilize the large number of 6-pounders captured from Austria and Prussia in 1794–1800.

From 1805, the Year XI system started to replace the captured ordnance. Gradually, the Gribeauval 4- and 8-pounders began to be replaced by the Year XI 6-pounder and the Gribeauval 6-pouce (6.4-inch) howitzer was replaced by the Year XI 24-pounder howitzer. In 1808, due to financial considerations, the old Gribeauval carriages were cannibalised to create new carriages for the Year XI gun tubes. During this period, many Gribeauval 4- and 8-pounders were withdrawn into arsenals. However, the 8-pounder continued to be used in Spain since the terrain was not suitable for the heavier 12-pounder. The new Year XI 6-pounder was rushed into production, but it ultimately proved to be too fragile. In 1810 a commission headed by Nicolas-Marie Songis des Courbons determined that the Year XI system should be discontinued and the Gribeauval system retained, but that a new 6-pounder should be introduced. Under the Bourbon Restoration in 1815, the 4- and 8-pounders were brought back into service and the new 6-pounders withdrawn based on a survey carried out by Charles-Étienne-François Ruty.

In 1829, the Gribeauval system was replaced by the Valée system which was developed by Sylvain Charles Valée. The new system reduced the calibers of field artillery to 8- and 12-pound cannons and 24-pound and 6-inch howitzers. Mobility was increased by standardizing limbers so that 8-pounders and 24-pound howitzers used the smaller size while 12-pounders and 6-inch howitzers used the larger size. Gunners rode into action while sitting on the limbers rather than walking beside the guns. All batteries were armed with four cannons and two howitzers.

== Notes ==
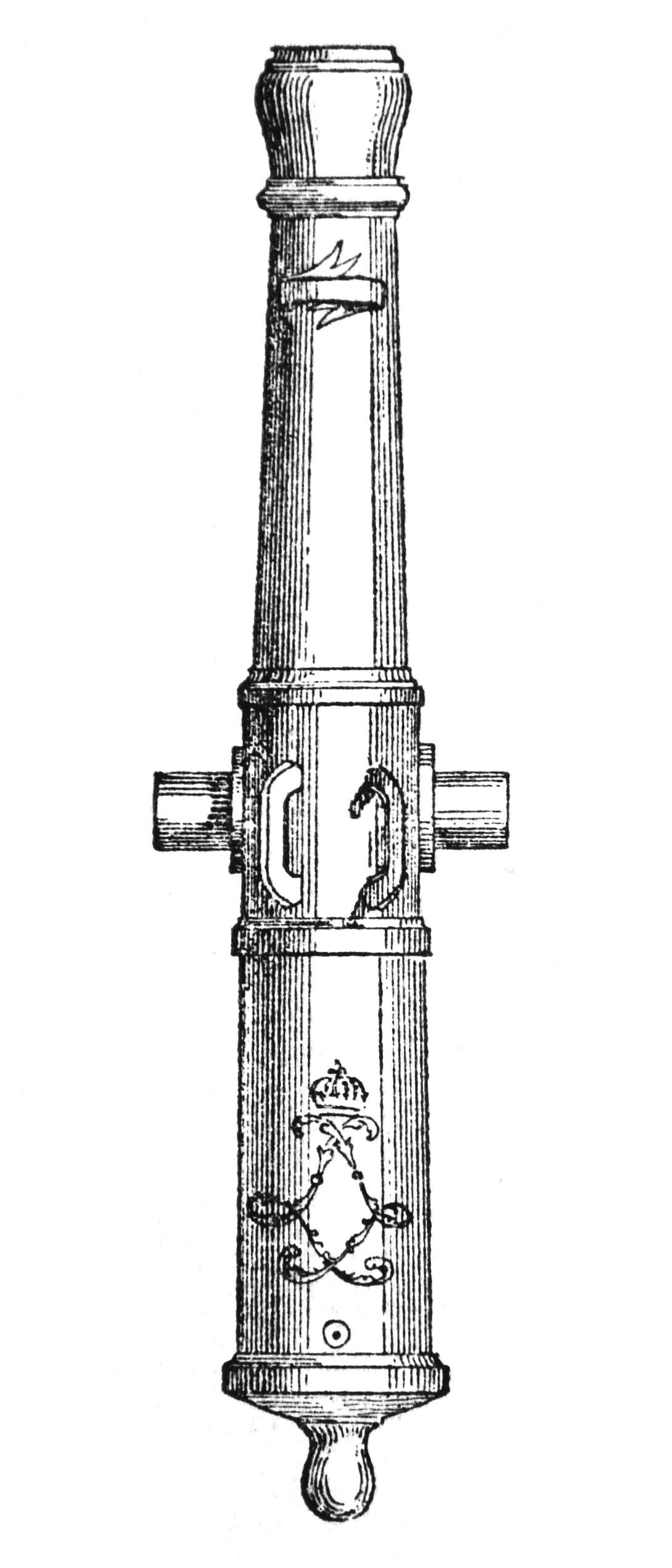
16-pounder Gribeauval siege cannon

== See also ==
- Graves, Donald (2011). "Louis de Tousard and his "Artillerists Companion": An Investigation of Source Material for Napoleonic Period Ordnance". Smoothbore Ordnance Journal (1): 88–97. ISBN 978-1-907417-13-9.
- Smith, Digby (2011). "The 18 Questions on Austrian Artillery that Gribeauval Answered in his report Dated March 1762". Smoothbore Ordnance Journal (1): 60–65. ISBN 978-1-907417-13-9.
- Summerfield, Stephen (2011a). "Summary of Gribeauval's Life". Smoothbore Ordnance Journal (2): 9–23. ISBN 978-1-907417-14-6.
- Summerfield, Stephen (2011b). "Gribeauval Garrison Carriage". Smoothbore Ordnance Journal (2): 36–56. ISBN 978-1-907417-14-6.

(See pp. 687–688.)
Media related to Gribeauval system at Wikimedia Commons

== Conversions ==
This website is useful for converting Old French pounds (livres) into English pounds and Old French inches (pouces) into English inches.

- Gershtein, Sergey; Gershtein, Anna (2013). "Livre Conversion Chart (Weight and Mass Converter, Old French)".
- Gershtein, Sergey; Gershtein, Anna (2013). "Pouce Conversion Chart (Length Units Converter, Old French)".
