= Canon de 4 Gribeauval =

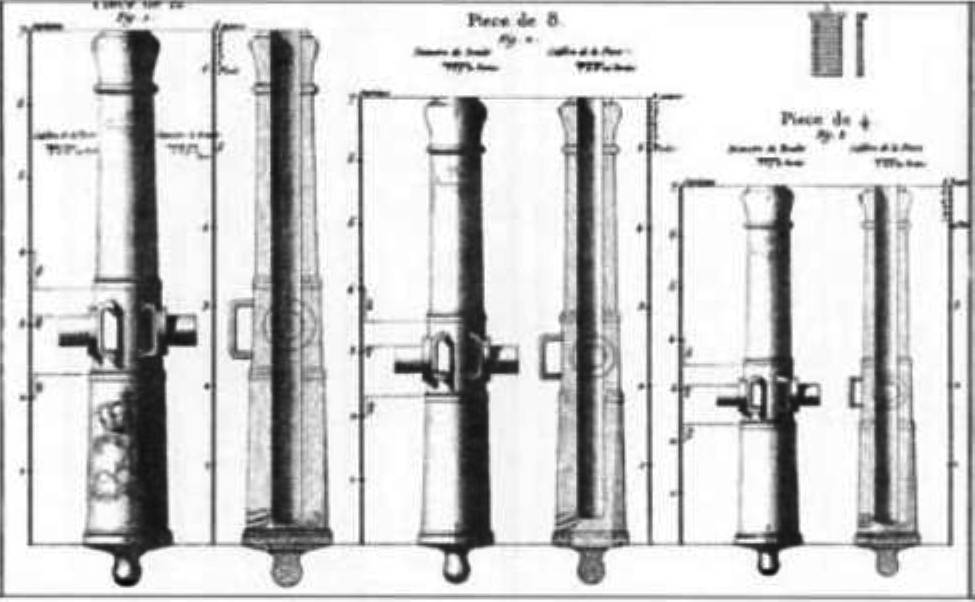
- The Canon de 4 Gribeauval, was the lightest gun among the Canon de 8 Gribeauval (center) and the Canon de 12 Gribeauval (left).
- Place of origin: France

Service history
- Used by: France
- Wars: American Revolutionary War; French Revolutionary Wars; Napoleonic Wars

Production history
- Designer: Jean Baptiste Vaquette de Gribeauval
- Designed: 1765

Specifications
- Mass: 289 kg (637 lb)
- Barrel length: 1,600 mm (5.2 ft)
- Crew: 8 men, 3–4 horses
- Caliber: 84 mm (3.3 in)
- Barrels: 1
- Carriage: 660 kg (1,455 lb)
- Rate of fire: 2–3 rounds per minute
- Effective firing range: Ball: 700 m (766 yd); Canister: 400 m (437 yd)
- Maximum firing range: 1,200 m (1,312 yd)

The Canon de 4 Gribeauval or 4-pounder was a French cannon and part of the artillery system developed by Jean Baptiste Vaquette de Gribeauval. The Old French pound (French: livre) was 1.079 English pounds, making the weight of shot about 4.3 English pounds. In the Gribeauval era, the 4-pounder was the lightest weight cannon of the French field artillery; the others were the medium Canon de 8 Gribeauval and the heavy Canon de 12 Gribeauval. The Gribeauval system was introduced in 1765 and the guns were first employed during the American Revolutionary War. The most large-scale use of Gribeauval guns occurred during the French Revolutionary Wars and the Napoleonic Wars. At first a pair of 4-pounders were assigned to each infantry battalion and were often called battalion pieces. Later, Emperor Napoleon took the guns away from the infantry units and began to replace the 4-pounder with the 6-pounder, using captured guns as well as newly cast French cannons. However, as the French infantry declined in quality after 1809, the 4-pounders were reintroduced in order to provide direct support for formations of foot soldiers. All Gribeauval cannons were capable of firing canister shot at close-range and round shot at long-range targets. The Gribeauval system supplanted the older Vallière system, was partly replaced by the Year XI system in 1803 and completely superseded by the Valée system in 1829.

== History ==
The Gribeauval system was approved by the king and officially adopted by the French army on 15 October 1765. It was quietly introduced to keep it secret from foreign powers but also to avoid an unfriendly reaction from conservative elements in the French Royal Army. In fact, resistance within the French army prevented full implementation of the system until 1776. The Gribeauval system included 4-, 8- and 12-pounder field pieces, the Obusier de 6 pouces Gribeauval (6-inch howitzer) and the 1-pounder light cannon, though the 1-pounder was quickly abandoned. The Canon de 4 Gribeauval was used extensively during the French Revolutionary Wars (1792–1802) and the Napoleonic Wars (1803–1815). However, its first major operational use came during the American Revolutionary War (1775–1783). The new cannons were employed by the French expeditionary corps under Jean-Baptiste Donatien de Vimeur, comte de Rochambeau in 1780–1782 including the 1781 Siege of Yorktown at Yorktown, Virginia.

The Gribeauval system replaced a system developed in 1732 by Florent-Jean de Vallière. The earlier system lacked a howitzer and its heavy cannons were difficult to move. These shortcomings became more obvious during the War of the Austrian Succession (1740–1748) and the Seven Years' War (1756–1763). Gribeauval made both the barrels and the carriages lighter, so that his cannons were about half the weight of the Vallière guns. Other improvements were the addition of a screw to elevate the barrel, a tangent gunsight and carriages with interchangeable parts.

The 4-pounder was originally assigned directly to the infantry units. Later, Napoleon decided to replace the 4-pounder with the heavier 6-pounder. Large numbers of Austrian and Prussian 6-pounders were captured in 1794–1800 and utilized to up-gun the French armies. The 6-pounders were too heavy for the infantry regiments to use, so they were taken from the infantry units and massed into batteries. Also, the French began manufacturing the Canon de 6 système An XI. This piece was designed to make the French system conform to the European 6- and 12-pounder standard. The new 6-pounder proved to be unsuccessful and was finally abandoned. Instead, the French employed large numbers of captured Austrian 6-pounders. After 1809 Napoleon reintroduced the 4-pounder for direct infantry support due to the lower quality of French and French-allied foot soldiers.

In 1829 France adopted the Valée system, which reduced the calibers of field artillery to 8- and 12-pound cannons and 24-pound and 6-inch howitzers. It improved mobility by standardizing limber sizes so that the 8-pounders and 24-pound howitzers used the smaller limber and the 12-pounders and 6-inch howitzers used the larger type. In both cases, the gunners rode into action while sitting on the limbers instead of having to walk beside the guns. A battery was established as having four cannons and two howitzers.

== Crews ==
Any cannon could be served by as few as six artillerists, but to achieve maximum rates of fire more gunners were needed according to Digby Smith. David G. Chandler numbered eight men in the 4-pounder gun crews, including five specialists. Smith agreed that the 4-pounder crew required eight men and added that a single cannon was often controlled by a non-commissioned officer while two or more cannons were commanded by an officer. The duties of the gun crew were to separate the gun carriage from the limber (unlimber), to load, aim, and fire the gun, defend the gun, move the gun by manpower, reattach the gun carriage to the limber, and march with the gun.

The number 1 gunner stood to the right and mopped out the barrel after a discharge and rammed home the cartridge and shot. The number 2 gunner stood to the left of the cannon and inserted the cartridge and shot. The number 3, or most experienced gunner stood behind the piece, aiming and firing the cannon. Additional crewmen brought new ammunition to load, kept matches burning and the touch hole clear, repositioned the gun after firing, observed the fall of shot, and manned the ammunition wagon. A trained 4-pounder crew could fire a sustained rate of two rounds per minute. In an emergency, a skillful crew would be able to increase that rate of fire. Moving the 4-pounder required a team of three or four horses. During the period 1792–1815, French artillerists wore dark blue coats and breeches. White gaiters were worn in the summer and black gaiters in the winter. In the French service, the bicorne hat was worn until 1807, when it was replaced by the shako.

== Specifications ==
The Canon de 4 Gribeauval threw a round shot that weighed 4 French pounds. Used until 1840, the French pound (French: livre) weighed 489.41 grams while the English pound weighed 453.6 grams. There were 1.079 English pounds to the livre. According to Smith, the barrel of the 4-pounder weighed 600 lb (272 kg) or 150 times the projectile weight. The length of the cannon was 18 calibers, that is, 18 times the diameter of the bore. The carriage weighed 757 lb (343 kg) and limber weighed 591 lb (268 kg), making a total weight of barrel, carriage and limber of 1,948 lb (884 kg). Chandler asserted that the gun barrel weighed 637 lb (289 kg) and the carriage (including the limber) weighed 1,454 lb (660 kg). The width of the bore was 84 millimetres (3.31 in) and the barrel length was 1,600 millimetres (63.0 in). All French field guns had a clearance of 2.705 millimetres (0.106 in) between the cannonball and the inside of the barrel.

Chandler and Kevin F. Kiley wrote that the trail chest contained 18 round shot while the caisson carried an additional 100 round shot and 50 canister shot rounds. One caisson was assigned to each 4-pounder. Of the 50 canister rounds, 26 were heavy canister containing 41 larger projectiles while 24 were light canister with 63 smaller projectiles. The canister round was propelled by 1.75 lb (0.79 kg) of gunpowder. The amount of gunpowder in the round shot firing charge was 1.5 lb (0.68 kg). The maximum range of the 4-pounder was 1,200 metres (1,312 yd). The effective range was 700 metres (766 yd) for round shot and 400 metres (437 yd) for canister.

== Tactics ==
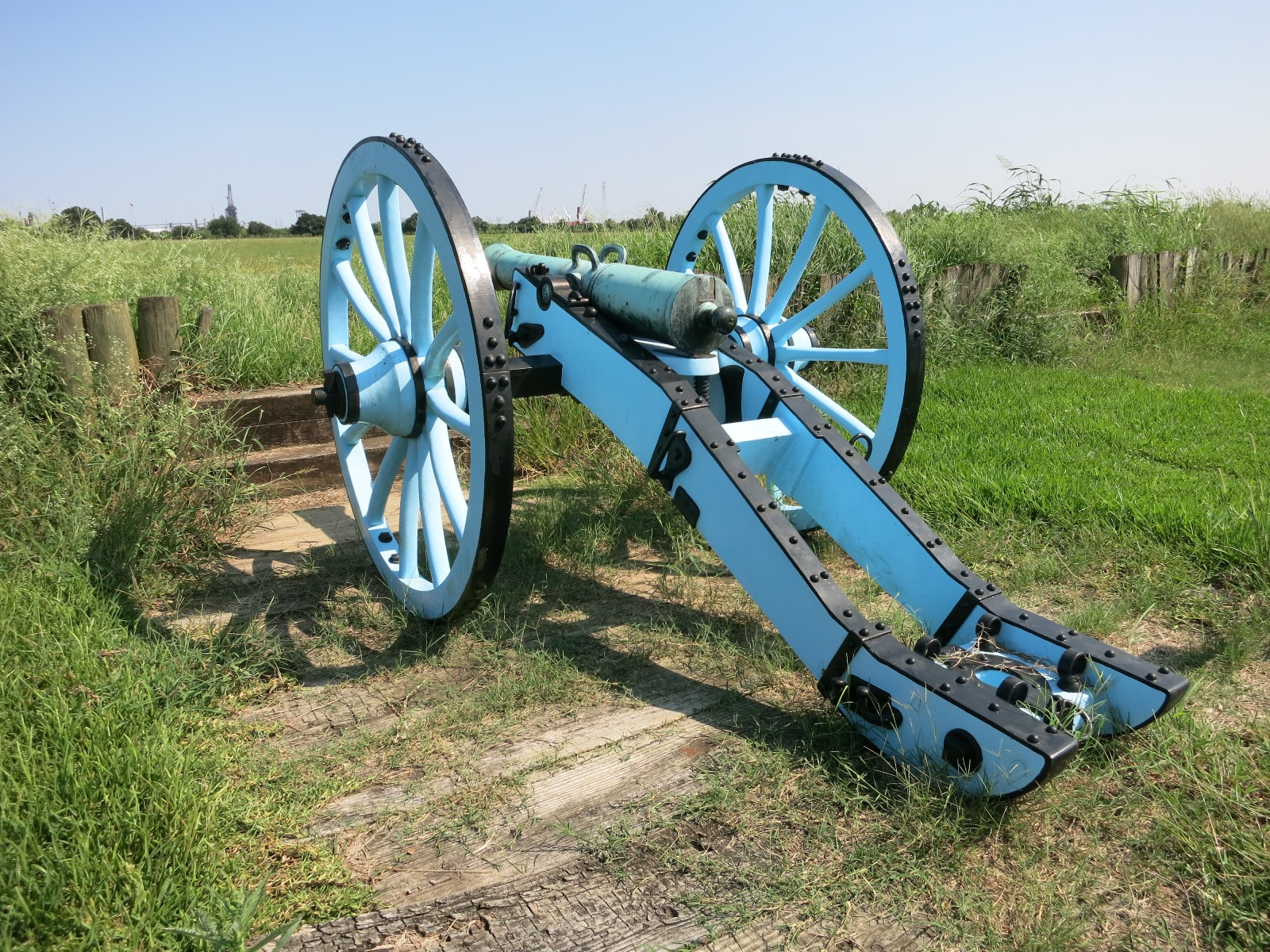
A 4-pounder Gribeauval cannon is sited in Battery 5 at Chalmette National Battlefield in New Orleans, La.

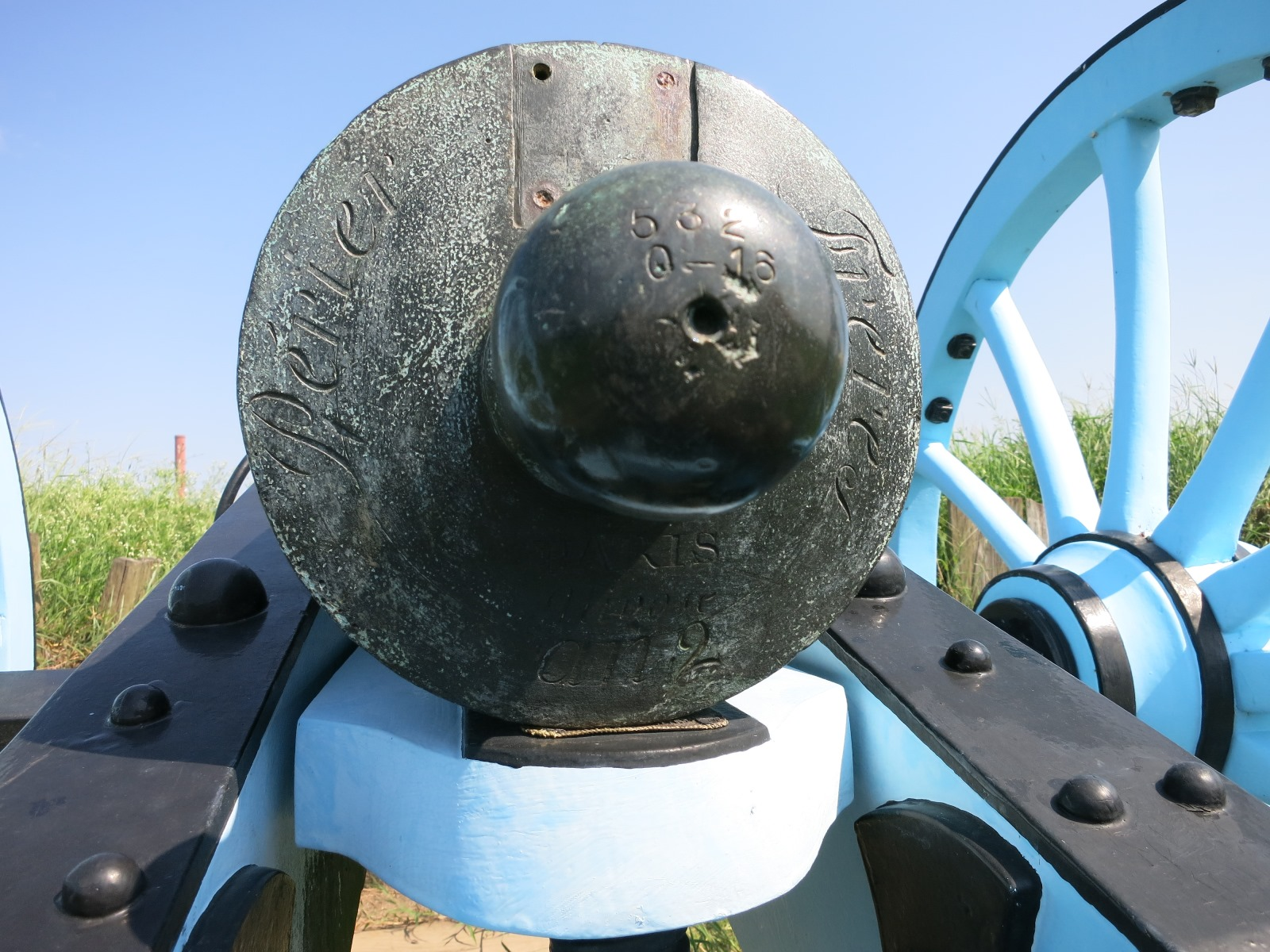
Close-up shows an inscription: PARIS Nivose An 2 (21 Dec 1793–19 Jan 1794) and Périer Frères (Périer Bros.).

Canon de 4 Gribeauval

In the Napoleonic era, artillery became one of the three main combat arms, together with infantry and cavalry. Field guns won many battlefield victories. In 1800 French armies employed about two artillery pieces per 1,000 soldiers. The number increased to as many as five guns per 1,000 by 1812 as the quality of foot soldiers diminished. Under Napoleon batteries usually included eight pieces and the 4-pounder was often employed in advance guards, divisional reserves and horse artillery batteries of the reserve. Frequently, batteries were made up of six cannons and two howitzers. At beginning of the French Revolutionary Wars, all armies attached 3- and 4-pounder cannons directly to the infantry units. They were supposed to be served by trained gunners but in reality they were often worked by infantrymen drafted from the ranks. Each infantry battalion had two 4-pounders attached to it and the guns were frequently called battalion pieces. Partly due to an overall lack of field guns, Napoleon removed the battalion pieces from infantry battalions and combined them into batteries. After his defeat at the Battle of Aspern-Essling in 1809, Napoleon reversed this policy and rearmed his infantry units with battalion pieces.

Artillery was rarely placed inside a village because of the danger of the buildings catching fire and detonating the ammunition. Instead the guns were placed alongside a village or on a hill behind it. On the battlefield, the light artillery was stationed in the front line or covering the flanks. Typically, howitzers were assigned to a battery to use their long-range shell fire. In order to achieve mutual support, batteries were placed 600–900 paces apart. If action was imminent, the cannons would be loaded in advance and two matches kept lit. If forced to unlimber under fire, it was best to approach the desired position from a flank to present the thinnest target. When an eight-gun battery was unlimbered, the cannons fired in turn, one every four seconds, in order to keep the target under continuous fire.

The cannonball or round shot was the projectile used most often. Both direct and ricochet fire might be used to strike a target. Round shot was most effective when used against formed troops, particularly those in column and to a lesser degree against those in line. Most soldiers hated to be under long-range artillery fire because they were unable to shoot back at their tormentors with shorter-ranged muskets. The British avoided exposing their troops to round shot by placing them behind crests when possible, but all other nations customarily deployed their soldiers in the open. At closer ranges, the gunners switched to canister, an anti-personnel weapon. A canister round consisted of a large number of musket balls that, when fired, spread out and flew in the direction of the target. When supporting an attack, the cannons advanced with the infantry. Half the guns moved forward, covered by the remaining guns, then the other half moved, repeating the process. The battalion pieces, usually 4-pounders, fired at the enemy foot soldiers while the heavier guns targeted the enemy artillery. When under attack by enemy infantry, the cannons first fired at the enemy artillery. As the range closed, the guns aimed at the enemy foot soldiers.

== Historic organizations ==
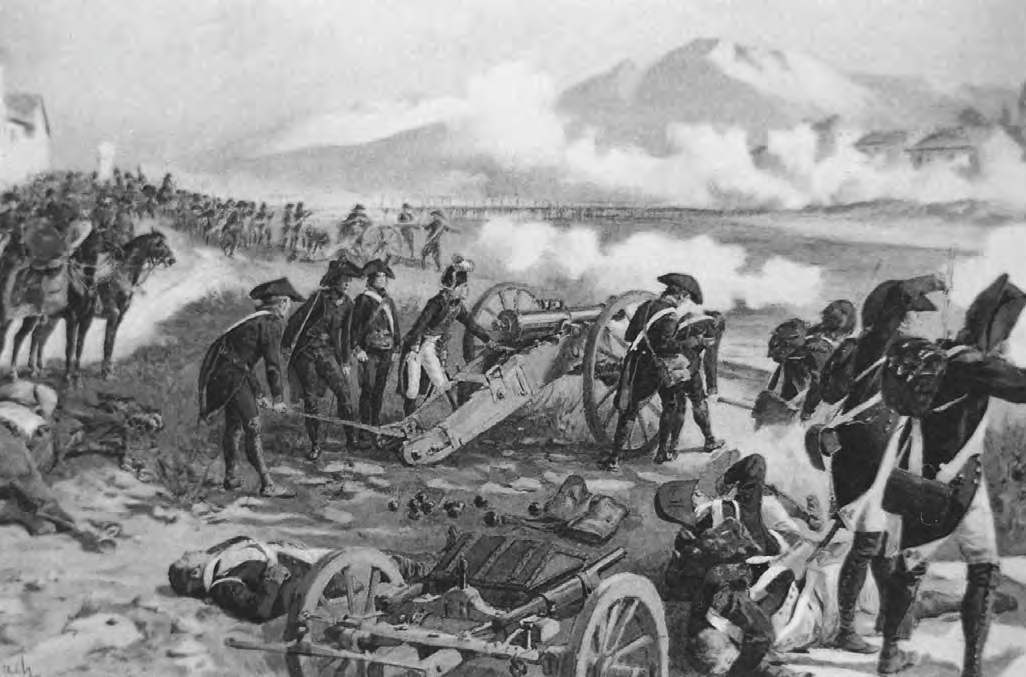
French cannons in action against the Austrians at the Battle of Lodi on 10 May 1796.

At the Battle of Marengo in 1800, Jean Boudet's division had four 4-pounders and four 8-pounders attached to it. The division of Jacques-Antoine de Chambarlhac de Laubespin had at least one 4-pounder among its five guns. While the chief of staff Louis-Alexandre Berthier asserted that Gaspard Amédée Gardanne's division was equipped with two captured 3-pounders, Gardanne reported that he had two 4-pounders during the battle.

For the War of the Fourth Coalition in 1806, Napoleon's Grand Army marched to war with the following numbers of 4-pounders in each corps organization. The Imperial Guard counted 14 4-pounders out of a total of 42 pieces, the III Corps had 11 of 46 guns, V Corps had two of 38 pieces, VI Corps had four of 24 guns and VII Corps had eight of 36 guns. The I Corps, IV Corps and Reserve Cavalry Corps had no 4-pounders in their artillery batteries; the light cannons being replaced by 6-pounders.

The 4-pounder was still being used during the War of the Fifth Coalition in 1809. In the II Corps the 4th Company of the 7th Artillery Regiment employed six 4-pounders and two 8-pounders, the 8th Company of the 5th Artillery had six 4-pounders and two 6-inch howitzers and the 5th Company of the 3rd Artillery had two 4-pounders, four 8-pounders and two 5½-inch howitzers. The first two companies were attached to the 1st and 2nd Infantry Divisions while the third company formed part of the corps reserve. In the III Corps, the infantry divisions each had a company of horse artillery attached. The 1st Division company had four 4-pounders, the 3rd Division company had six 4-pounders and the 4th Division company had two 4-pounders and five 6-pounders. In the Army of Italy horse artillery companies were organized with four 4-pounders and two 6-inch howitzers. These companies were attached to the divisions of Jean-Mathieu Seras, Jean-Baptiste Broussier, Paul Grenier, Gabriel Barbou des Courières, Jean Maximilien Lamarque, Louis Michel Antoine Sahuc and Emmanuel Grouchy. Four other divisions had companies armed with 6-pounders.

At the Battle of Talavera in 1809, the British captured 13 and the Spanish captured four French guns from Jean François Leval's division. The British prizes included four 8-pounders, four 6-pounders, one 4-pounder and two 6-inch howitzers. The other captured pieces were not recorded. All but two of the guns were soon recovered by the French at the Battle of Arzobispo.

The light cannon was being used as late as the 1814 Campaign. Michel Marie Pacthod's National Guard division had two 8-pounders and four 4-pounders attached at the Battle of Montereau on 17–18 February. A 15 March order of battle shows that in the French Army of the Rhône, the artillery companies of Louis François Félix Musnier's 1st and Alexandre, vicomte Digeon's Cavalry Divisions each included two 8-pounders, two 4-pounders and two 6-inch howitzers. Claude Joseph Pannetier's 2nd Division artillery company had two 8-pounders and two 4-pounders and Jean-Jacques Desvaux de Saint-Maurice's Artillery Reserve consisted of two 8-pounders and four 4-pounders.

At the Battle of Palo Alto on 8 May 1846, the Mexican army employed at least twelve 4-pounder and 8-pounder Gribeauval guns against the United States Army. (Note: The Gribeauval guns at the Chalmette National Battlefield are probably trophies captured during the Mexican–American War after the obsolete guns were sold to Mexico by France.)

== Notes ==
Footnotes

Citations
