= 12-inch mortar =

12-inch mortar may refer to:

- 12-inch coast defense mortar, a mortar used by the Coast Artillery Corps of the United States Army 1885–1945.
- Mortier de 12 Gribeauval, a mortar used by the French Army from 1780 to the mid-19th century.
