= Canon lourd de 8 Gribeauval =

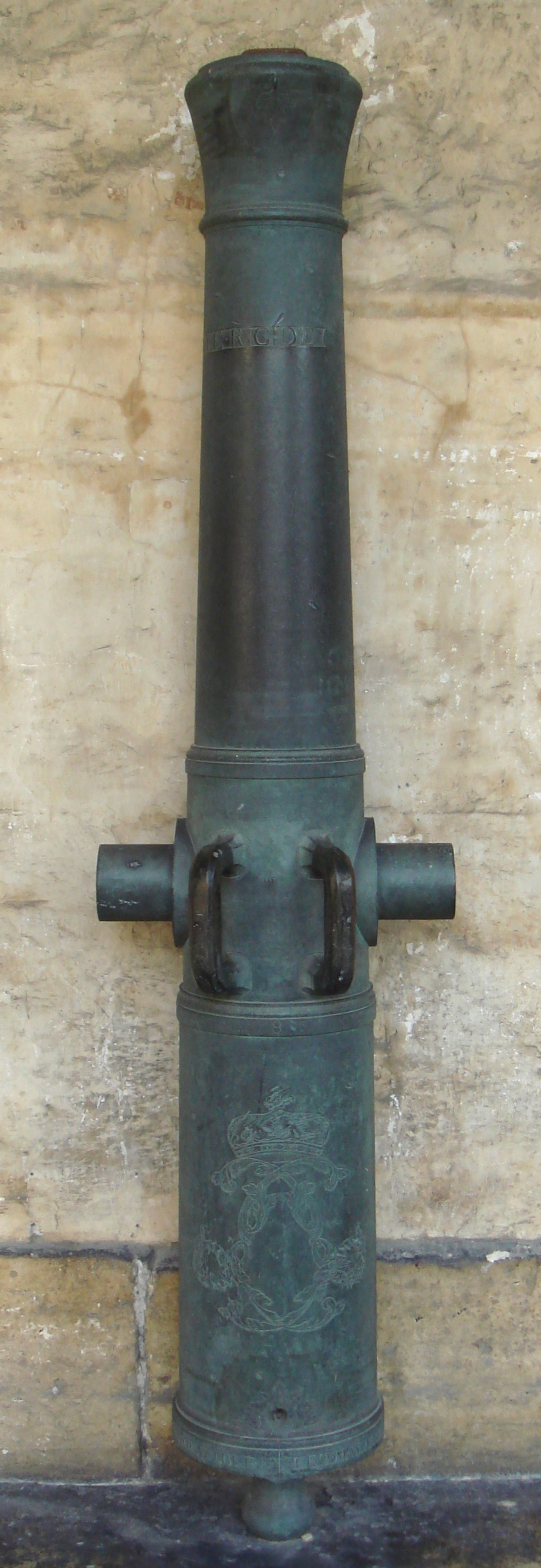
- Canon lourd de 8 Gribeauval, Le Rigide, Douai, Berenger, 1789
- Place of origin: France

Service history
- Used by: France
- Wars: French Revolutionary Wars; Napoleonic Wars

Production history
- Designer: Jean Baptiste Vaquette de Gribeauval
- Manufacturer: Berenger
- Produced: 1789

Specifications
- Mass: 1,060 kg
- Barrel length: 285 cm
- Caliber: 106.1 mm

The canon lourd de 8 Gribeauval (Gribeauval heavy 8-pounder cannon) was a French canon and part of the Gribeauval system developed by Jean Baptiste Vaquette de Gribeauval. It was part of the siege artillery.

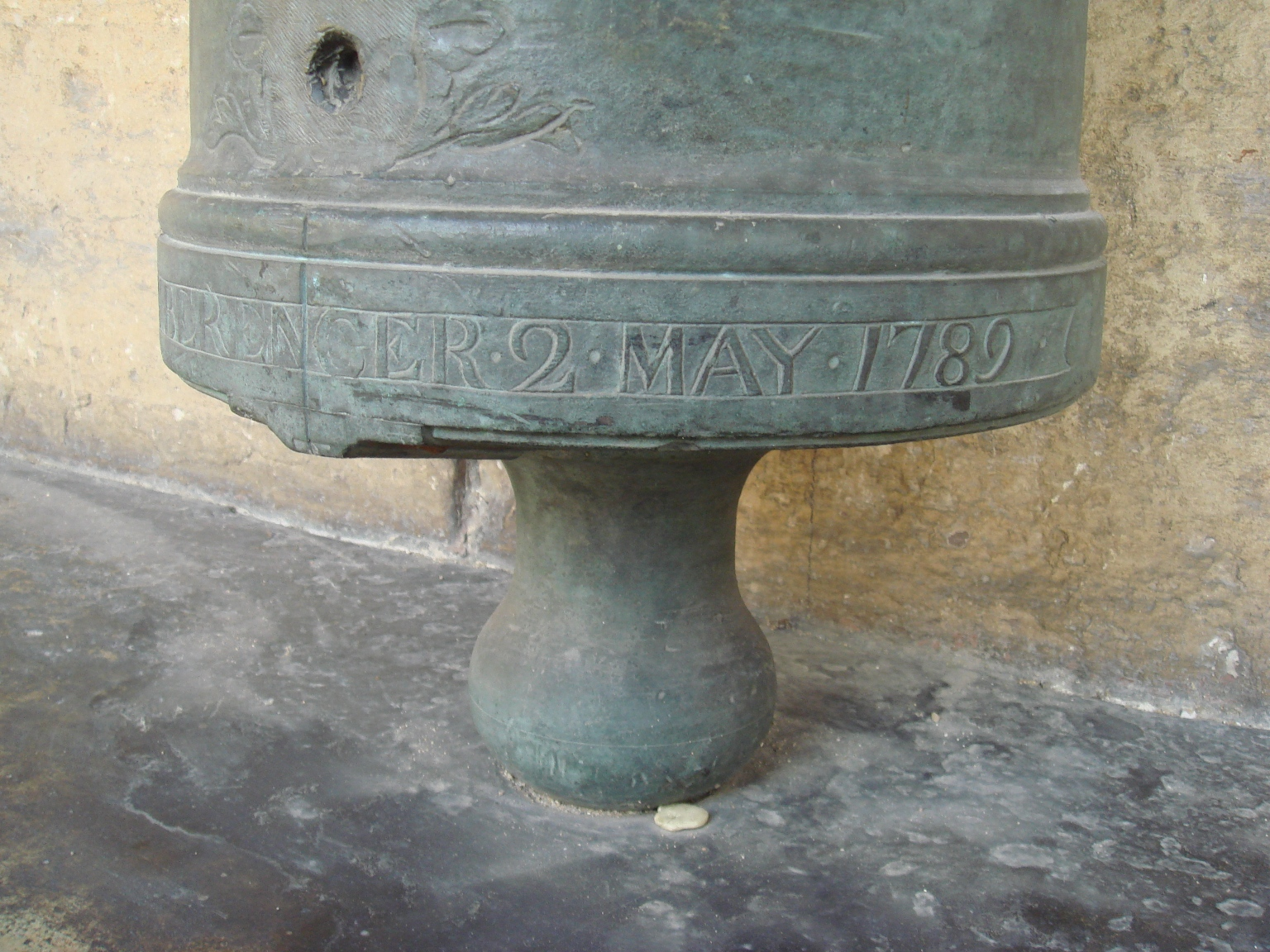
Breech of Le Rigide

The canon lourd de 8 Gribeauval was used extensively during the wars following the French Revolution, as well as the Napoleonic Wars.

Some of the earlier Gribeauval siege guns kept the baroque "dolphin" design for the handles.
