= Maritz =

Maritz may refer to:

- Paul Maritz, American businessman
- Gerrit Maritz, prominent Dutch Voortrekker
- Jean Maritz (1680–1743), a Swiss inventor
- Laurette Maritz, South African professional golfer
- Noelle Maritz, Swiss footballer
- Maritz Rebellion, aka Boer Revolt or the Five-Shilling Rebellion, occurred in South Africa in 1914
- Manie Maritz, a Boer commando and later rebel.
- Maritz, sales and marketing services company.
