= Canon lourd de 12 Gribeauval =

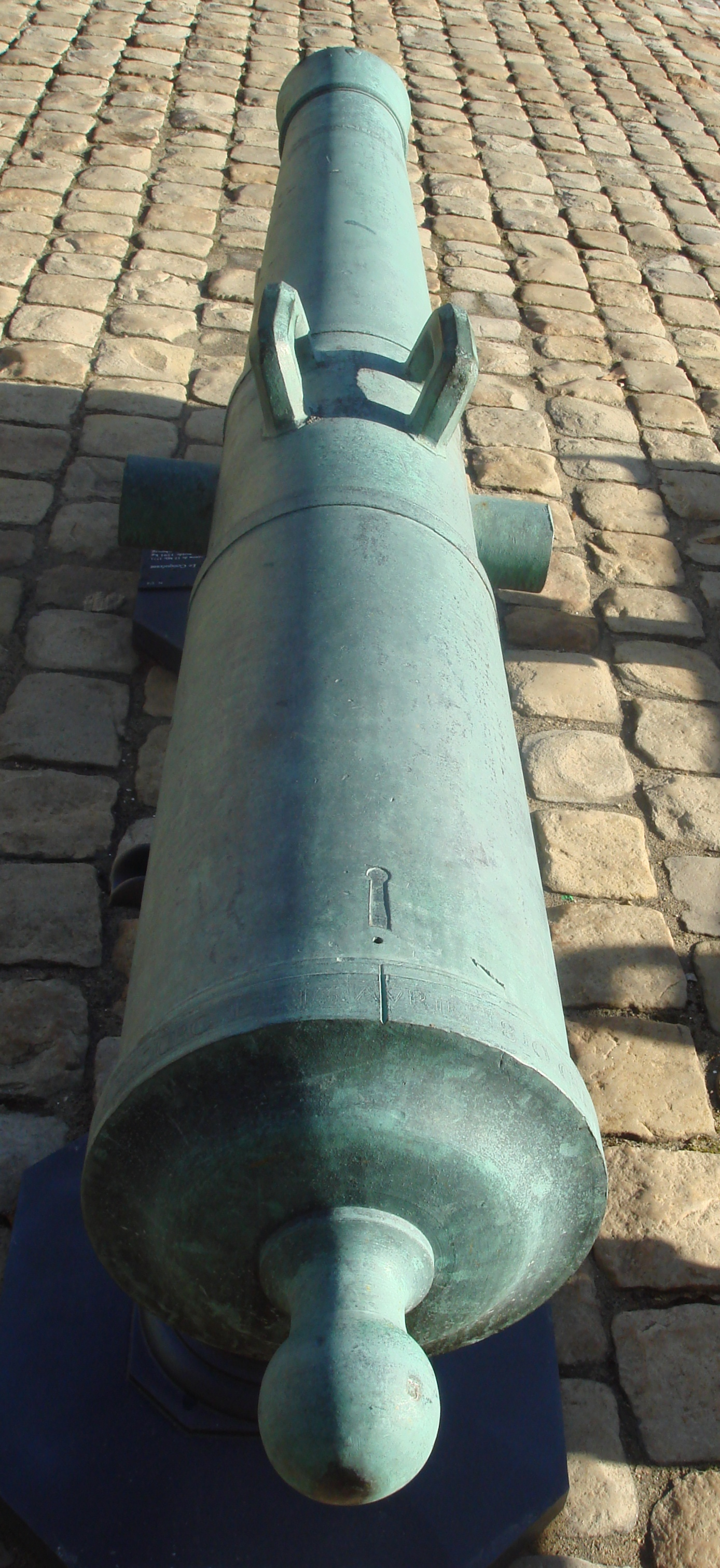
- Canon lourd de 12 Gribeauval Le Conquérant, for siege warfare.
- Place of origin: France

Service history
- Used by: France
- Wars: French Revolutionary Wars; Napoleonic Wars

Production history
- Designer: Jean Baptiste Vaquette de Gribeauval
- Designed: Modèle 1775
- Manufacturer: Strasbourg, Crucy
- Produced: 1810

Specifications
- Mass: 1,591 kg
- Barrel length: 317 cm
- Caliber: 121 mm

The Canon lourd de 12 Gribeauval (Gribeauval heavy 12-pounder cannon) was a French cannon and part of the Gribeauval system developed by Jean Baptiste Vaquette de Gribeauval. It was part of the siege artillery.

The canon lourd de 12 Gribeauval was used extensively during the wars following the French Revolution, as well as the Napoleonic Wars.

Some of the earlier Gribeauval siege guns kept the baroque "dolphin" design for the handles.

Canons lourds de 12 Gribeauval
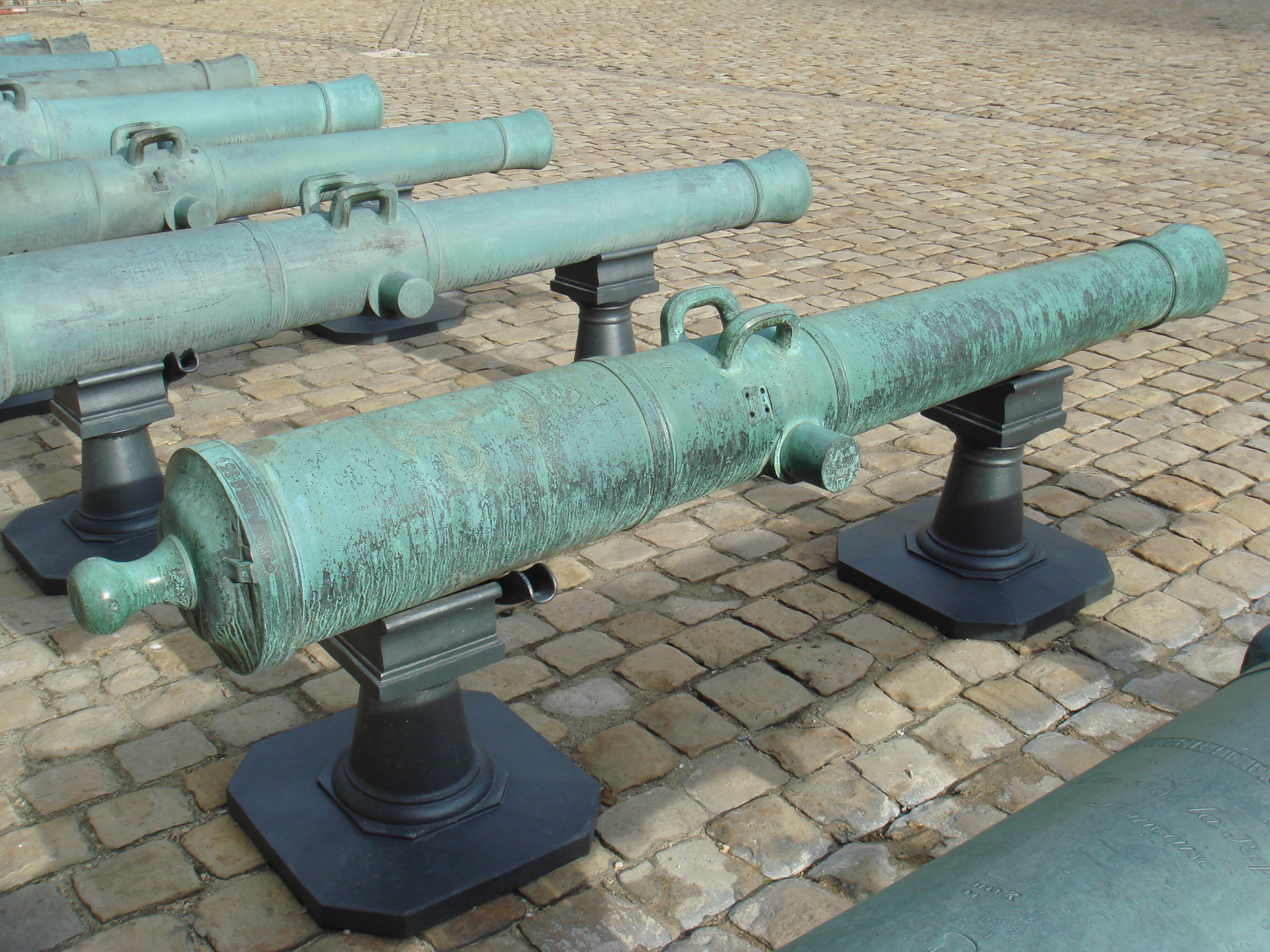
Canon lourd de 12 Gribeauval Le Sarasin, 1570 kg, 1780. Musée de l'Armée, Paris

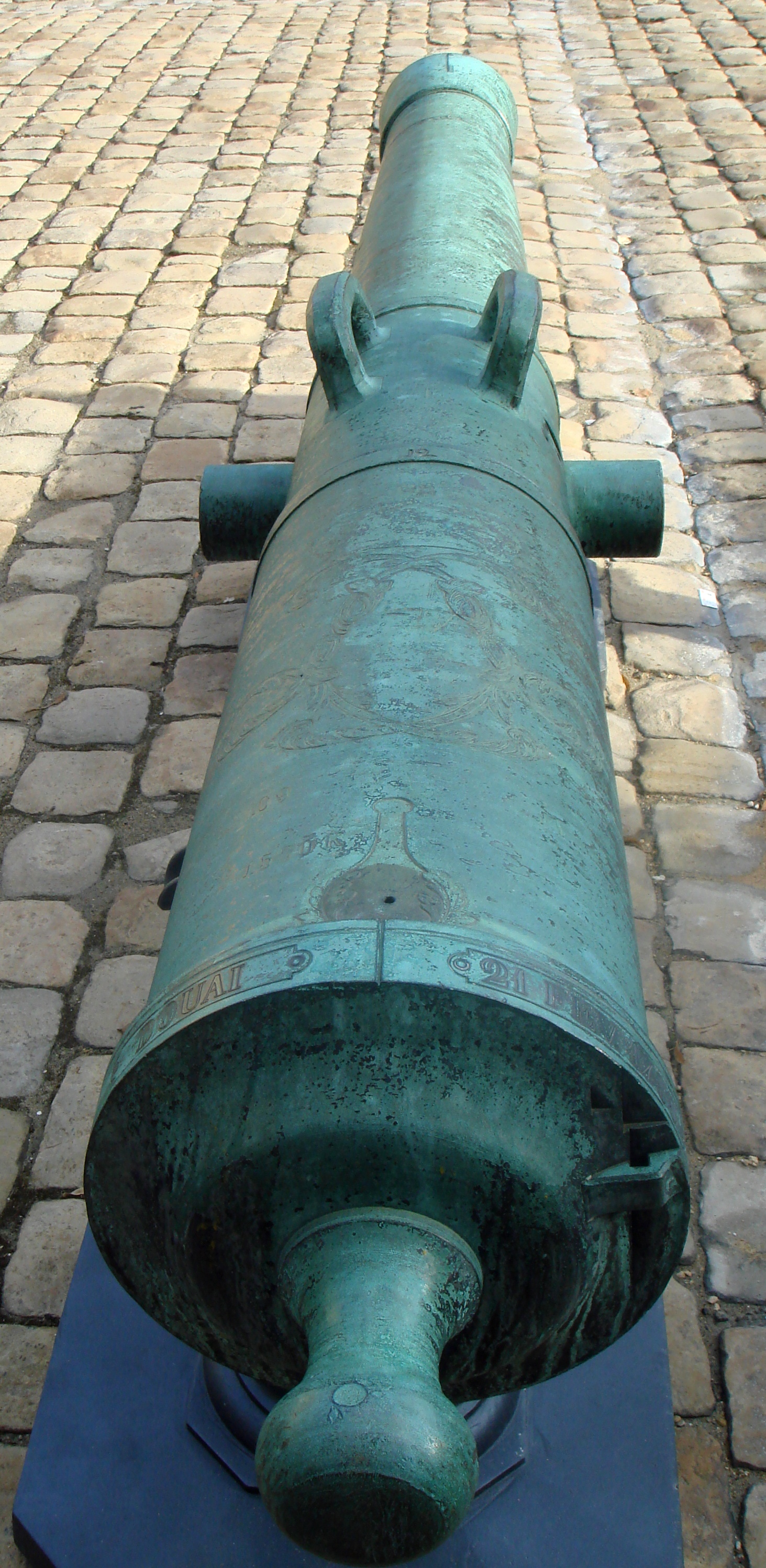
Le Sarasin.

== See also ==
Media related to Canon lourd de 12 Gribeauval at Wikimedia Commons
