= Mortier de 12 Gribeauval =

Mortier de 12 pouces Gribeauval
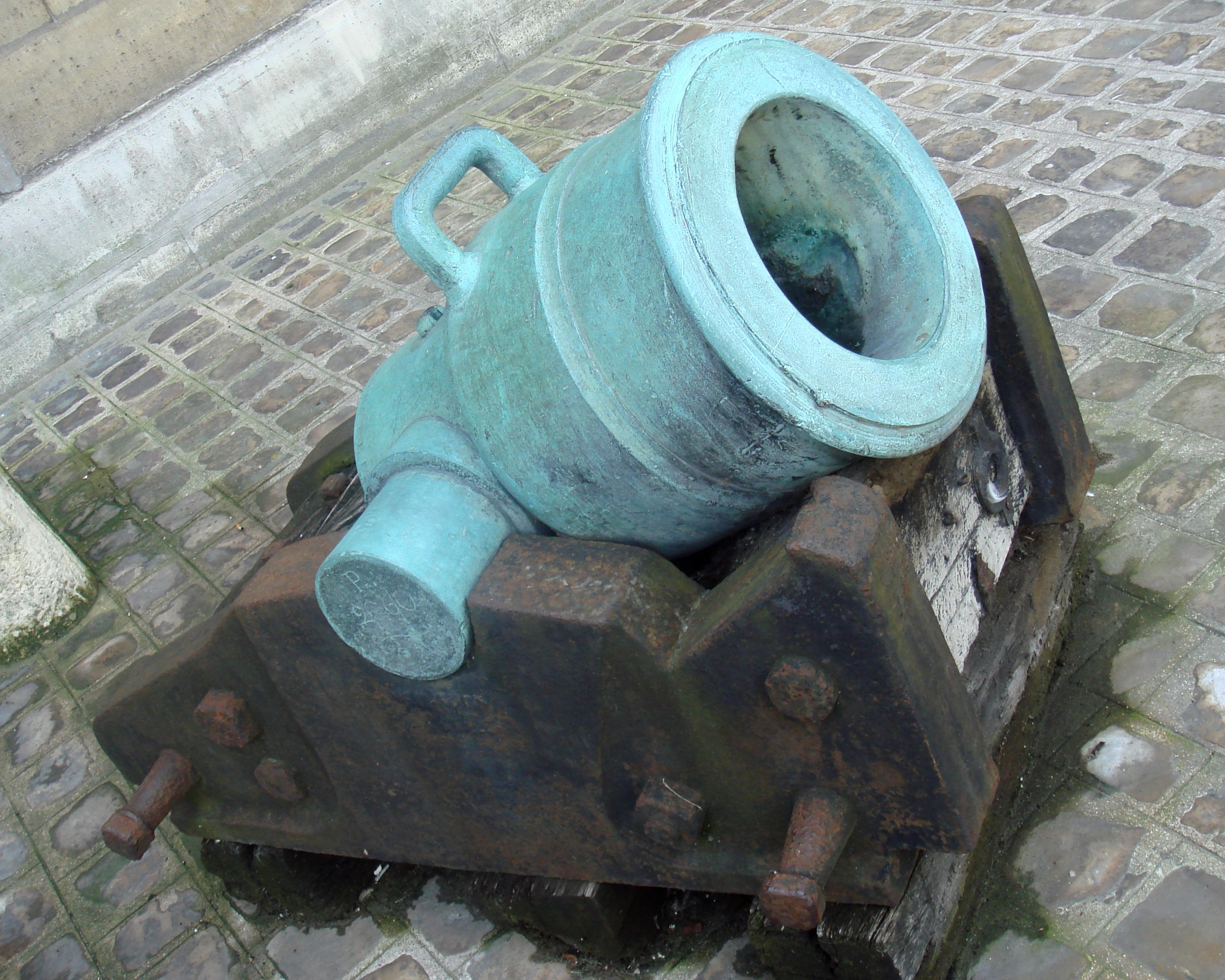
- 12-inches mortar (Mortier de 12 pouces Gribeauval) with cylindrical chamber, 1789, Les Invalides.
- Place of origin: France

Service history
- Used by: France
- Wars: French Revolutionary Wars; Napoleonic Wars; American War of Independence

Production history
- Designer: Jean Baptiste Vaquette de Gribeauval
- Manufacturer: Berenger
- Produced: April 1789

Specifications
- Mass: 1,540 kg
- Barrel length: 81 cm
- Crew: 15 men & 6 horses
- Caliber: 12 pouce (French inches) = 324.8 mm
- Barrels: 1, cylindrical chamber, brass

The Mortier de 12 pouces Gribeauval (Gribeauval 12-inch mortar) was a French mortar and part of the Gribeauval system developed by Jean Baptiste Vaquette de Gribeauval. It was part of the siege artillery. The measurement of the mortar is expressed by the diameter of the ball, using the French ancient system of measurement, in which 1 pouce (1 inch) is worth 2.707 cm.

The Mortier de 12 pouces Gribeauval was used extensively during the wars following the French Revolution, as well as the Napoleonic Wars. However, its first major operational use was even earlier, during the American Revolutionary War, in General Rochambeau's French expeditionary corps, from 1780 to late 1782, and especially at Yorktown in 1781.

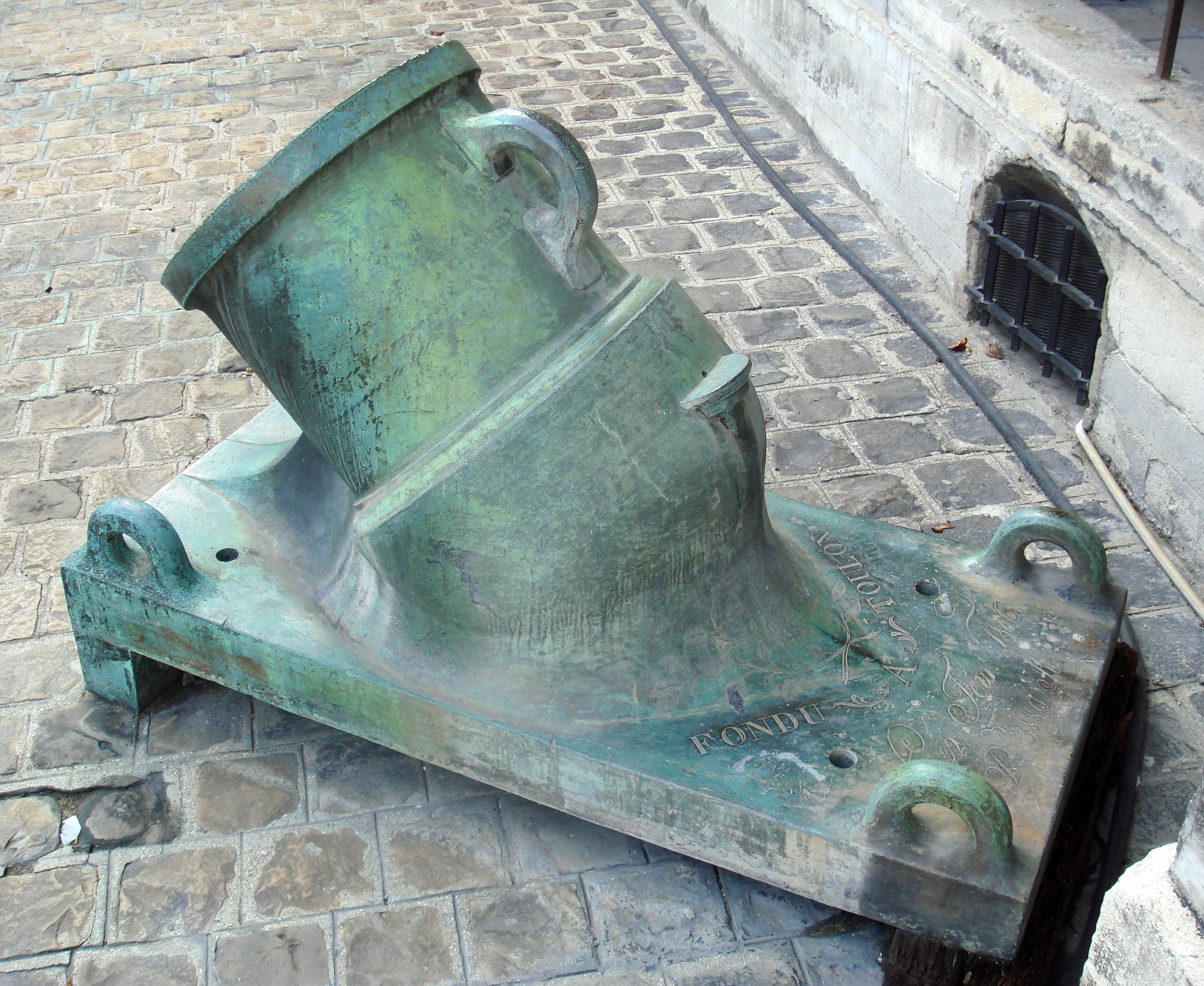
A Gribeauval coastal mortier de 12 pouces, with pear-shaped chamber (retained for power and range), 1806, Toulon.

== Gomer system ==
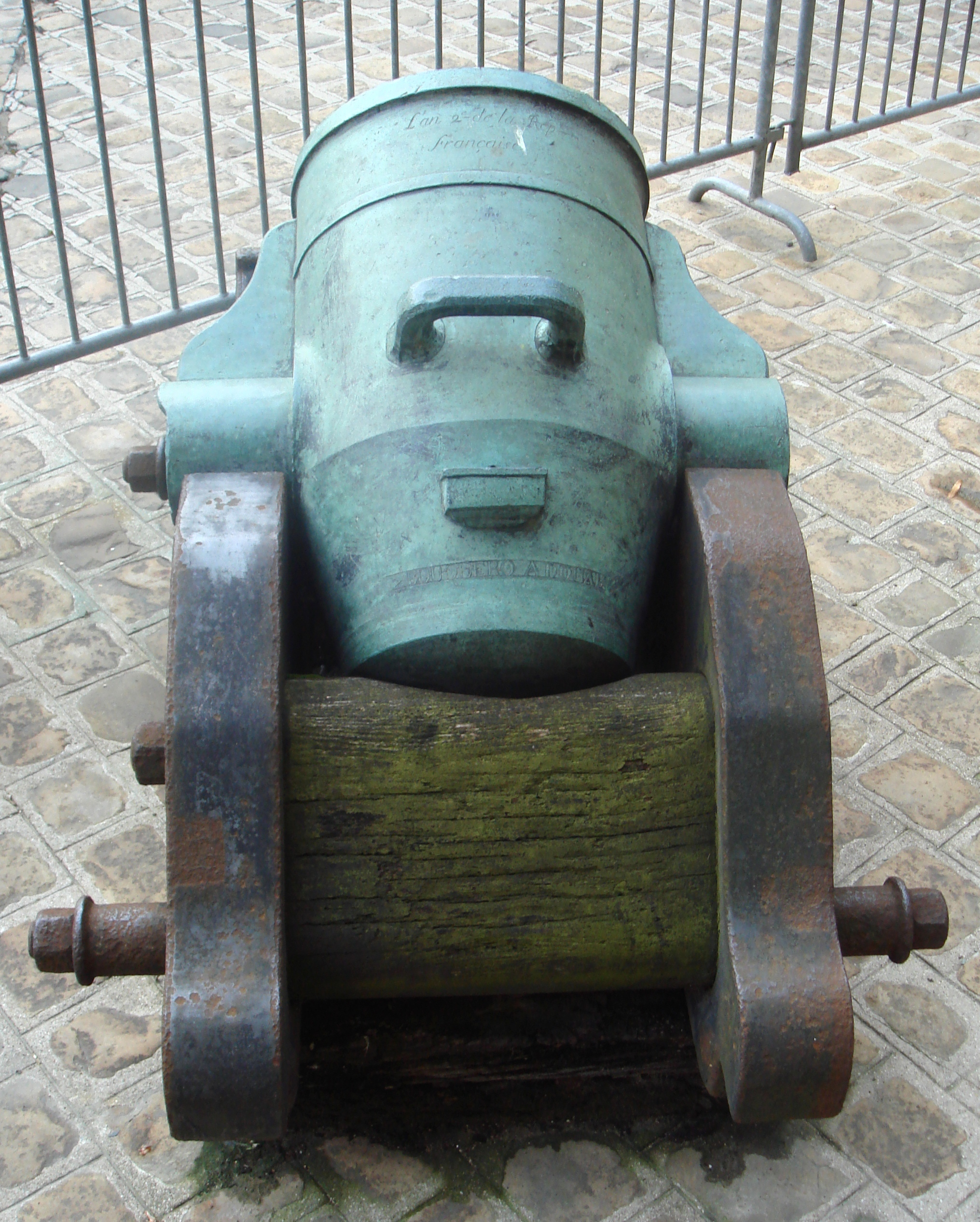
A 12-inch Gomer mortar with conical chamber, cast by Bouquero, An 2 de la République (1793-1794).

The Mortier de 12 pouces used a cylindrical chamber, which, although quite efficient, used to wear easily. It was superseded by the Gomer system using a conical chamber, which was incorporated in Gribeauval's system in 1789.

Some of the Mortier de 12 pouces were used in coastal defenses, in which case they were fixed on solid metal platforms.
