= Canon de 24 Gribeauval =

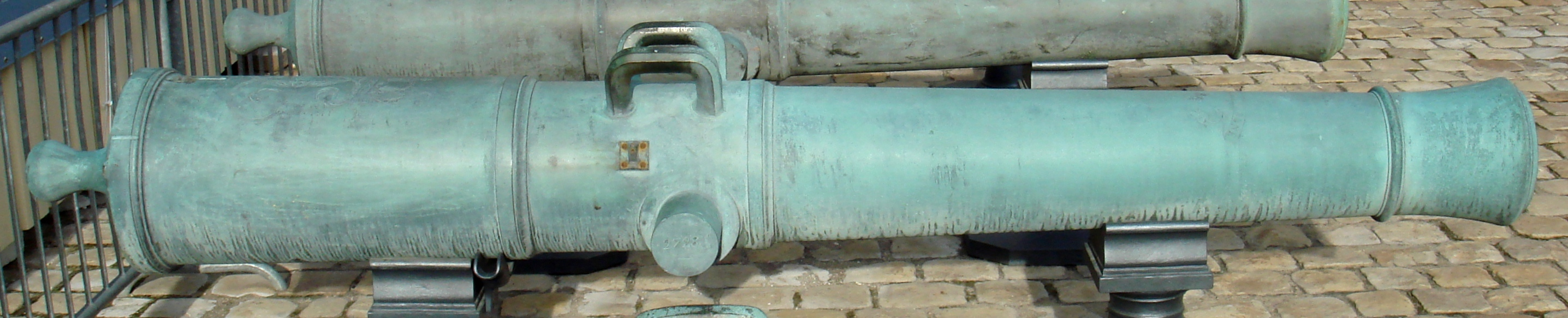
- Canon de 24 Gribeauval La Tour d Auvergne, modèle 1775, founded in 1828. Weight: 2,728 kg. Les Invalides.
- Place of origin: France

Service history
- Used by: France; Mysore
- Wars: French Revolutionary Wars; Napoleonic Wars

Production history
- Designer: Jean Baptiste Vaquette de Gribeauval
- Designed: 1770
- Produced: 1775

Specifications
- Mass: 2,740 kg
- Barrel length: 353 cm
- Caliber: 152.7 mm
- Barrels: 1

The Canon de 24 Gribeauval was a French 24-pounder cannon and part of the Gribeauval system developed by Jean Baptiste Vaquette de Gribeauval. It was part of the siege artillery.

The canon de 24 Gribeauval was used extensively during the wars following the French Revolution, as well as the Napoleonic Wars.

Some of the earlier Gribeauval siege guns kept the baroque "dolphin" design for the handles.

== Notes ==
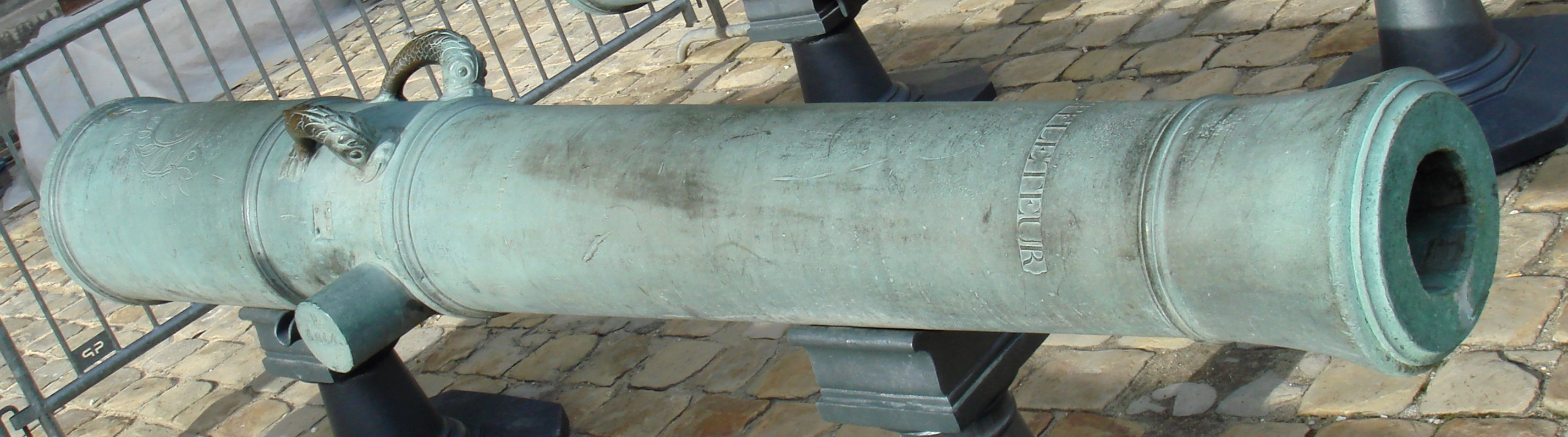
Canon de 24 Gribeauval, 1772, with dolphin handles, Le Souffleteur. Weight: 2,832 kg. Founder: J. Bérenger. Les Invalides.
