= Jean Maritz =

- Born: 1680; Burgdorf, Old Swiss Confederacy
- Died: 1743 (aged 62–63)
- Children: Jean Maritz II
- Engineering career
- Significant design: Vertical drilling machine, horizontal drilling machine for cannons
- Significant advance: Gun tube boring

Jean Maritz (1680–1743), also Johan Maritz, was a Swiss inventor, born in Burgdorf, Canton of Bern, who moved to France, becoming "Commissaire des Fontes" at Strasbourg (Commissioner of the King's Foundry), and invented the vertical drilling machine, as well as the horizontal drilling machine for cannons in the 18th century. His inventions revolutionized cannon-making and became a key component of the de Vallière system and contributed to the development of the later Gribeauval system.

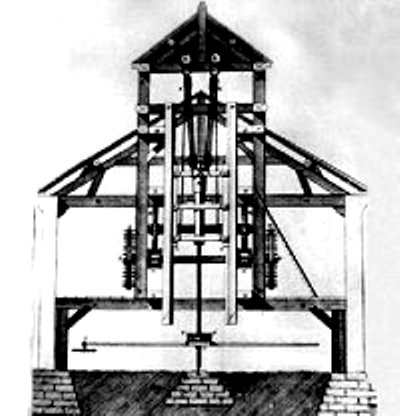
Vertical cannon drilling.

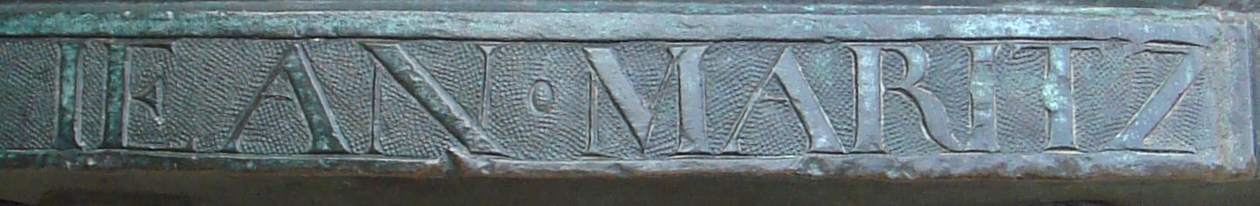
Signature of Jean Maritz II, son of Jean Maritz, on a cannon (Uranie) he founded in 1745.

Jean Maritz first invented a vertical drilling machine for cannons while in France in 1713. The vertical drilling method however, in which a cannon was slowly lowered over a turning drill, was very delicate, very time consuming and rather imprecise.

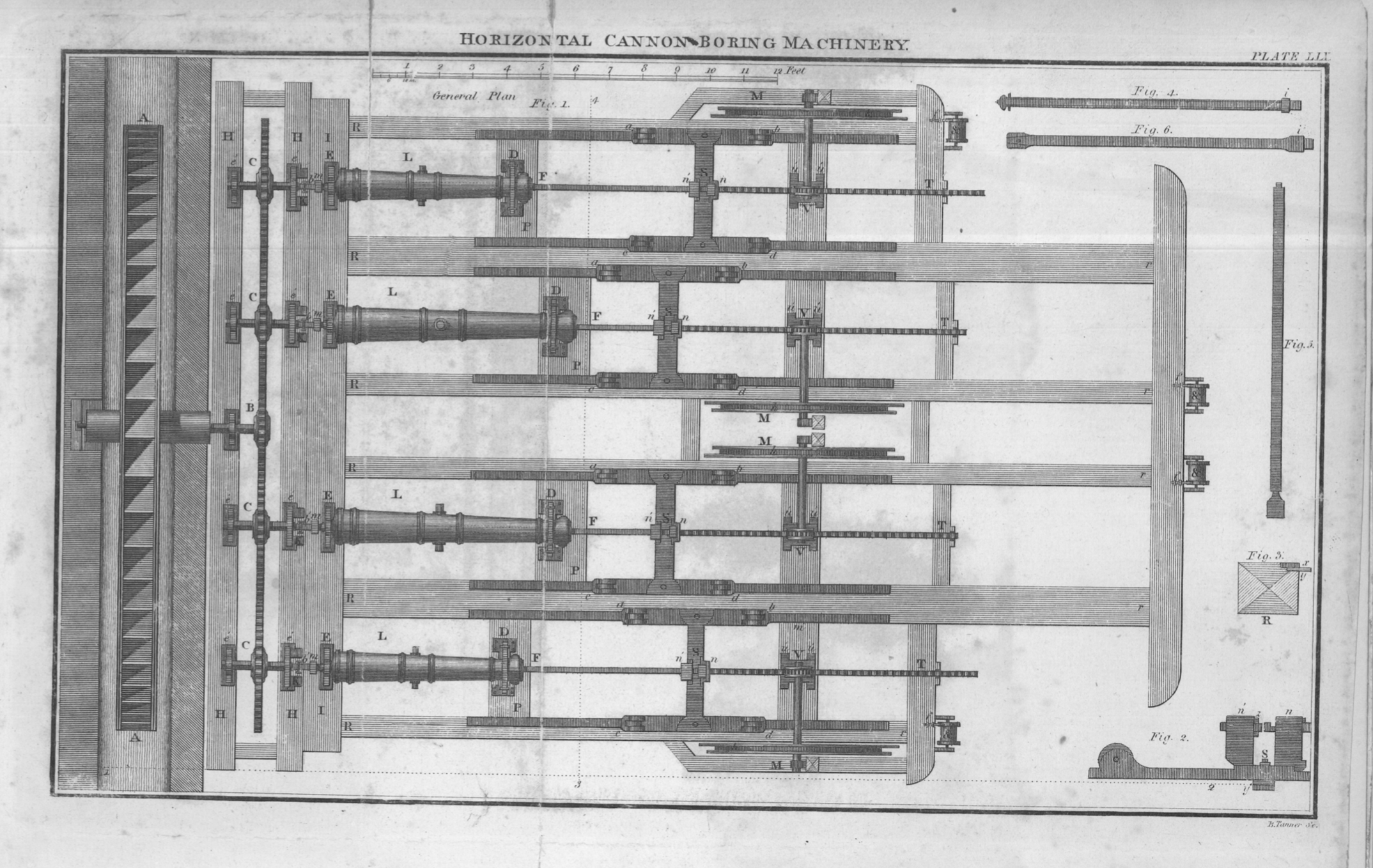
Chaillot Horizontal Cannon Boring Machinery, Plate LLX

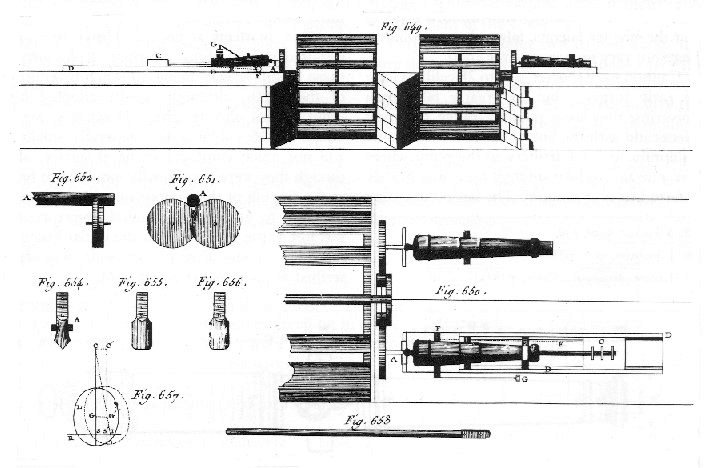
The Maritz method for horizontal cannon drilling. French 18th century encyclopedia.

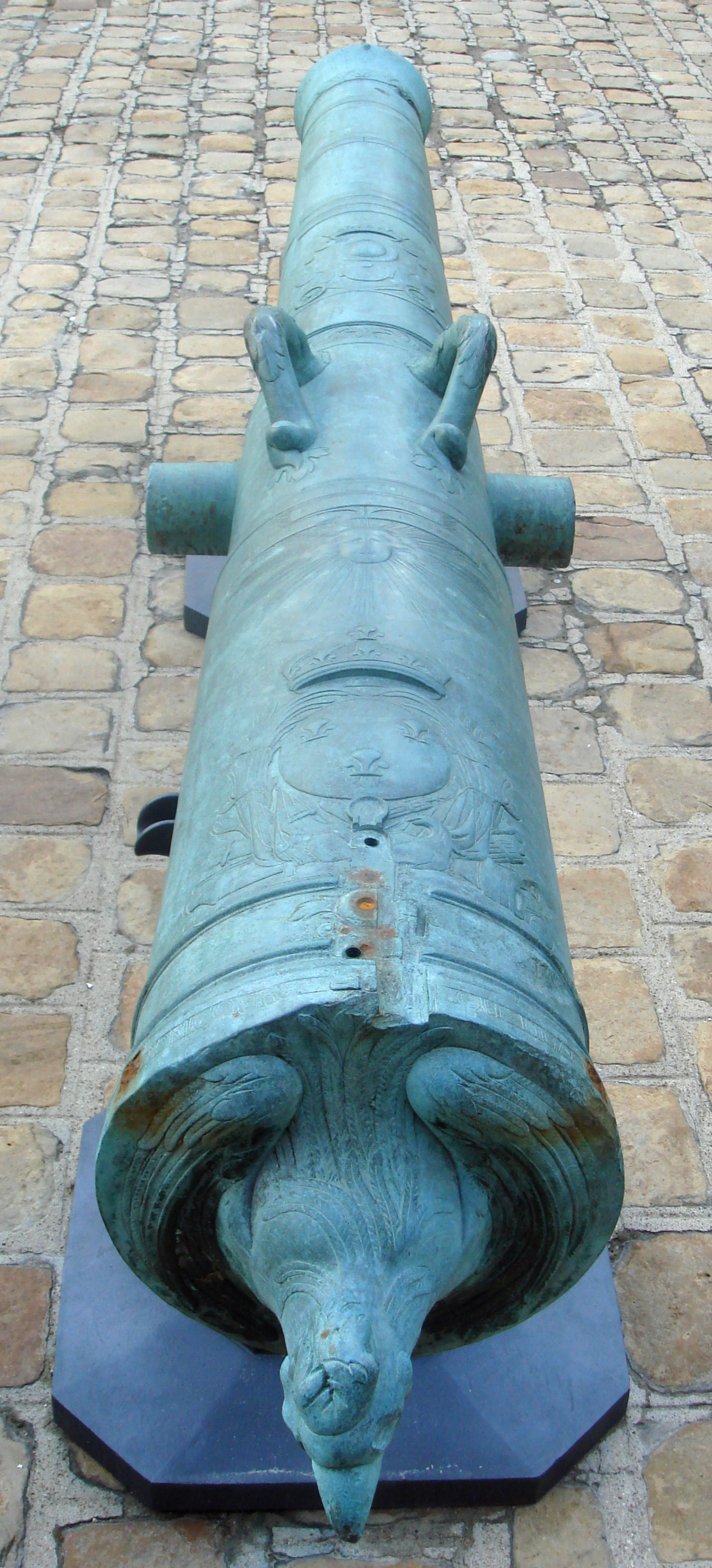
A canon de 12 de Vallière, founded by Jean Maritz in 1736.

He further developed a method for the horizontal drilling of cannons around 1734. These methods involved the drilling of a bore from a solid casting.

These inventions were vast improvements over previous methods, which involved founding the cannon around a clay core, which was removed after founding, leading to imprecision and shifting of the core, and therefore poor performance.

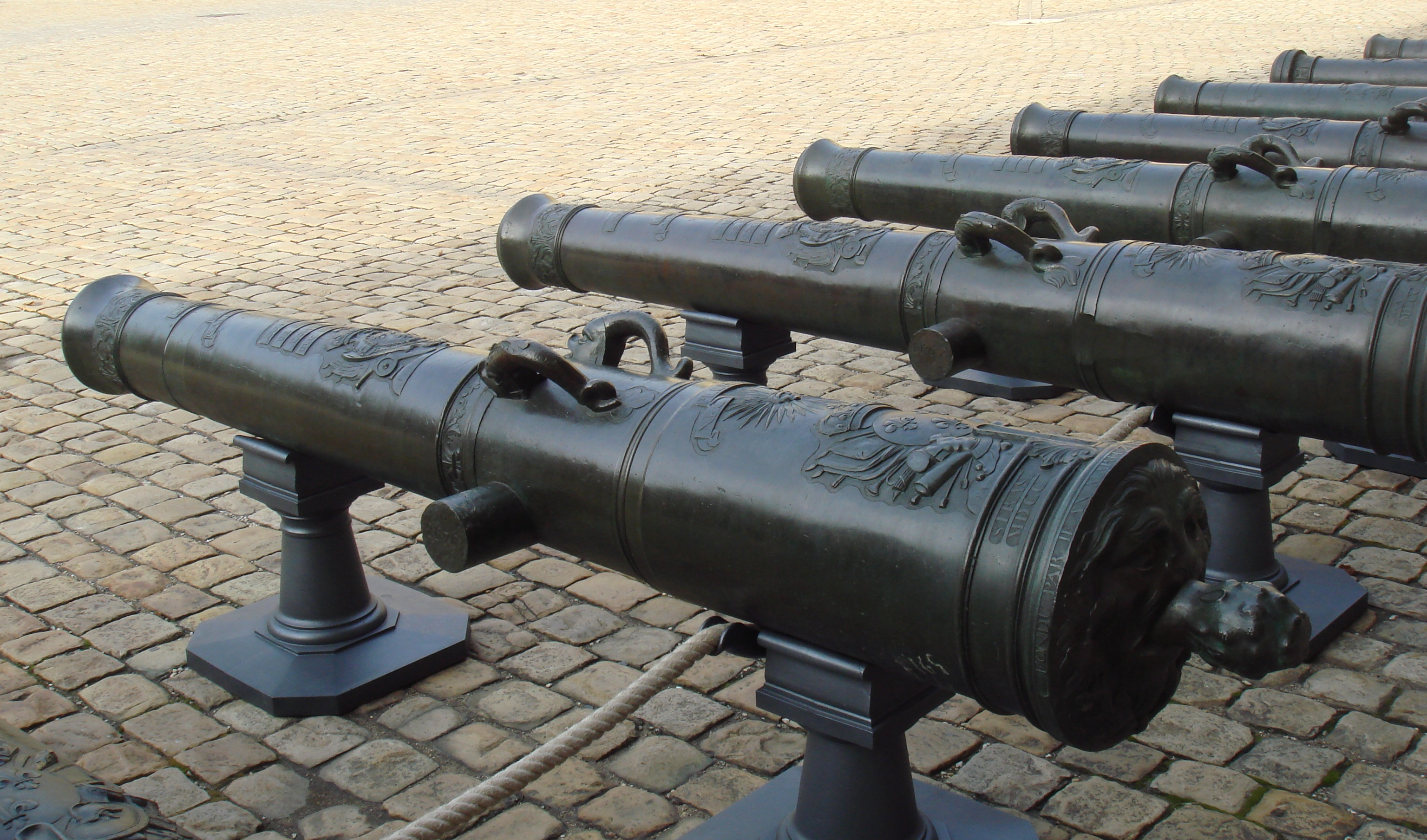
Jean Maritz cannons de 24.

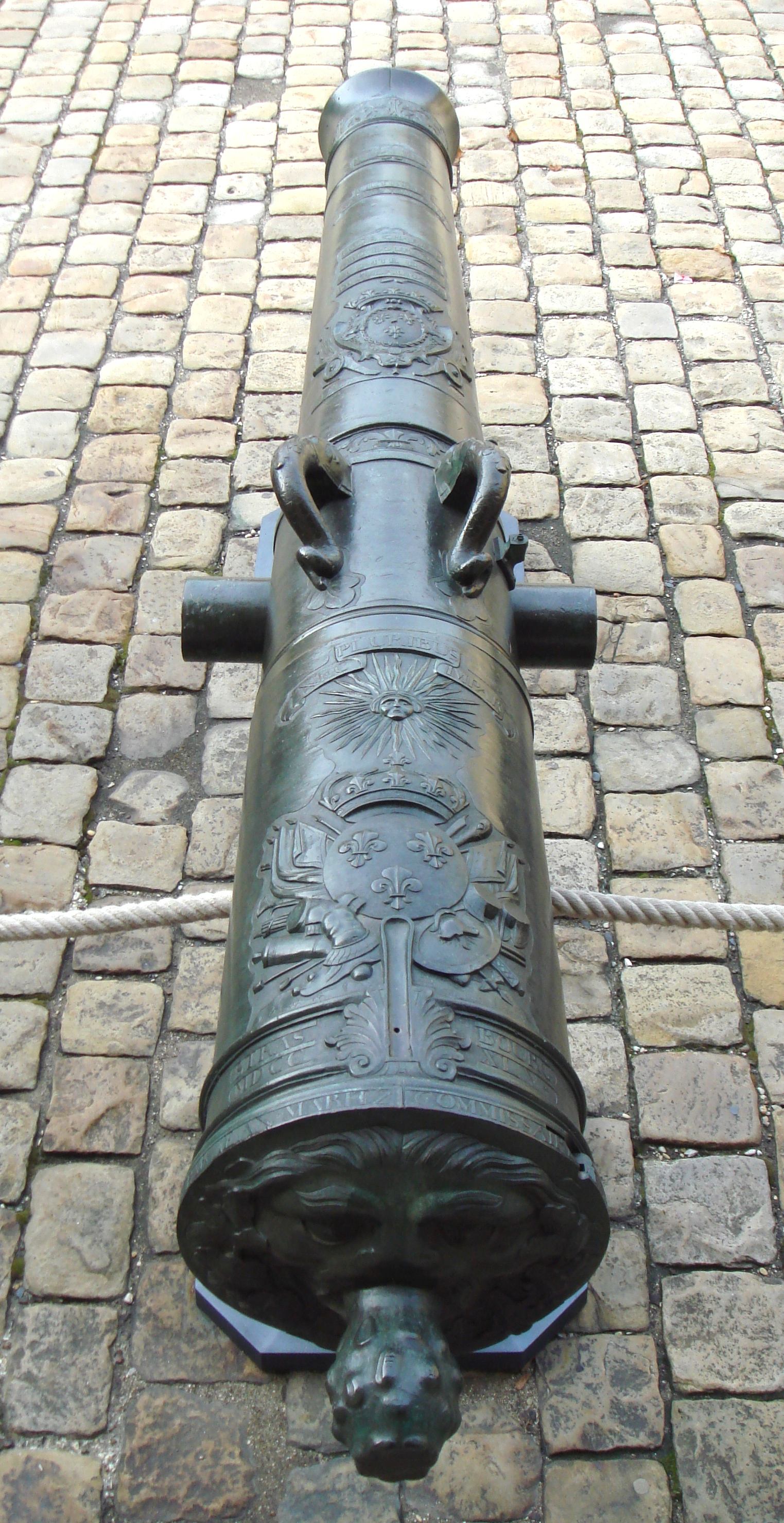
Jean Maritz cannon de 24 Uranie (the signature of Jean Maritz appears on the breech), founded in Strasbourg in 1745.

The inventions of Jean Maritz gave perfectly straight bores which could perfectly fit the ball diameter, and therefore vastly increase efficiency. In the horizontal method developed by Maritz, the solid-cast cannon itself was revolved horizontally, while the drill remained static, in a method similar to that of a lathe.

The son of Jean Maritz, Jean Maritz II (1712-1790), who had worked with his father on the development of boring, became Inspector General of Gun Foundries in 1755. He is credited with the innovation of the horizontal boring machine which can be seen in these images https://www.photo.rmn.fr/archive/06-526761-2C6NU0PLJPKE.html https://www.photo.rmn.fr/archive/06-526762-2C6NU0PLJZSL.html

The Maritz method would be central in the development of the Gribeauval cannon.

== See also ==
- John Wilkinson
