= Jean-Baptiste Vaquette de Gribeauval =

French general (1715–1789)

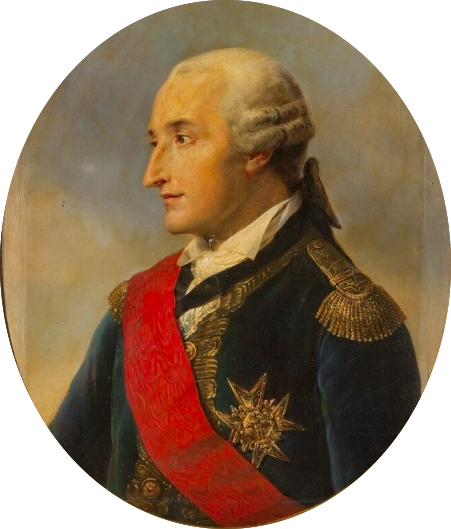
- Jean-Baptiste Vaquette de Gribeauval
- Born: 15 September 1715; Amiens, Kingdom of France
- Died: 9 May 1789 (aged 73) Paris, Kingdom of France
- Allegiance: Kingdom of France
- Branch: French Army
- Service years: 1732–1789
- Rank: Lieutenant general
- Conflicts: Seven Years' War; Siege of Glatz
- Awards: Military Order of Maria Theresa; Order of Saint Louis

Lieutenant General Jean-Baptiste Vaquette de Gribeauval (French pronunciation: [ʒɑ̃ batist vakɛt də ɡʁiboval]; 15 September 1715 – 9 May 1789) was a French artillery officer and engineer who revolutionised the French cannon, creating a new production system that allowed for lighter, more uniform guns without sacrificing range. His Gribeauval system superseded the de Vallière system. These guns proved essential to French military victories during the Napoleonic Wars. Gribeauval is credited as the earliest known advocate for the interchangeability of gun parts. He is thus one of the principal influences on the later development (over many decades by many people) of interchangeable manufacture.

== Early life ==
Jean-Baptiste was born in Amiens, the son of a magistrate. He entered the French royal artillery in 1732 as a volunteer, and became an officer in 1735. For nearly twenty years regimental duty and scientific work occupied him, and in 1752 he became captain of a company of miners. In 1755, he was employed in a military mission in Prussia.

In 1757, being then a lieutenant colonel, he was lent to the Austrian army on the outbreak of the Seven Years' War, and established the Austrian sapper corps. He led the sapping operations at the Siege of Glatz and the defence of Schweidnitz. At Schweidnitz, his 1748 design of fortification gun was tested and significantly improved by Master Carpenter Richter.

In 1762, he reported back to the Paris authorities on the Austrian artillery system compared with the existing French de Vallière guns. While with the Austrian army he also worked on the continued development of mining in siegecraft.

The empress Maria Theresa rewarded him for his work with the rank of Feldmarschallleutnant and the Grand Cross of the Military Order of Maria Theresa. On his return to France he was made maréchal de camp (major general), in 1764 Inspector of artillery, and in 1765 lieutenant général and commander of the Order of Saint Louis.

== Gribeauval system ==
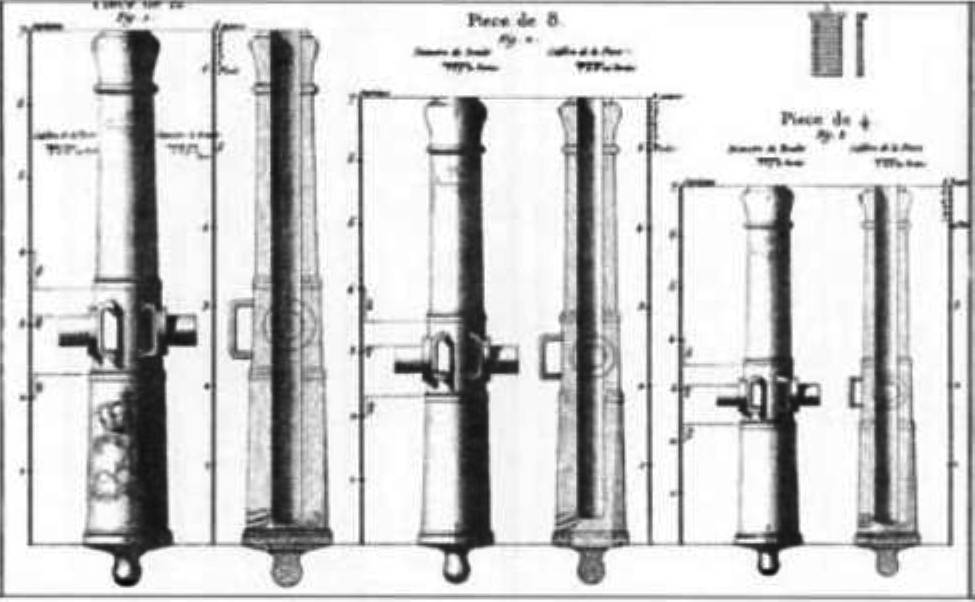
Part of the Gribeauval system: cannons of 12-, 8-, and 4-pounders

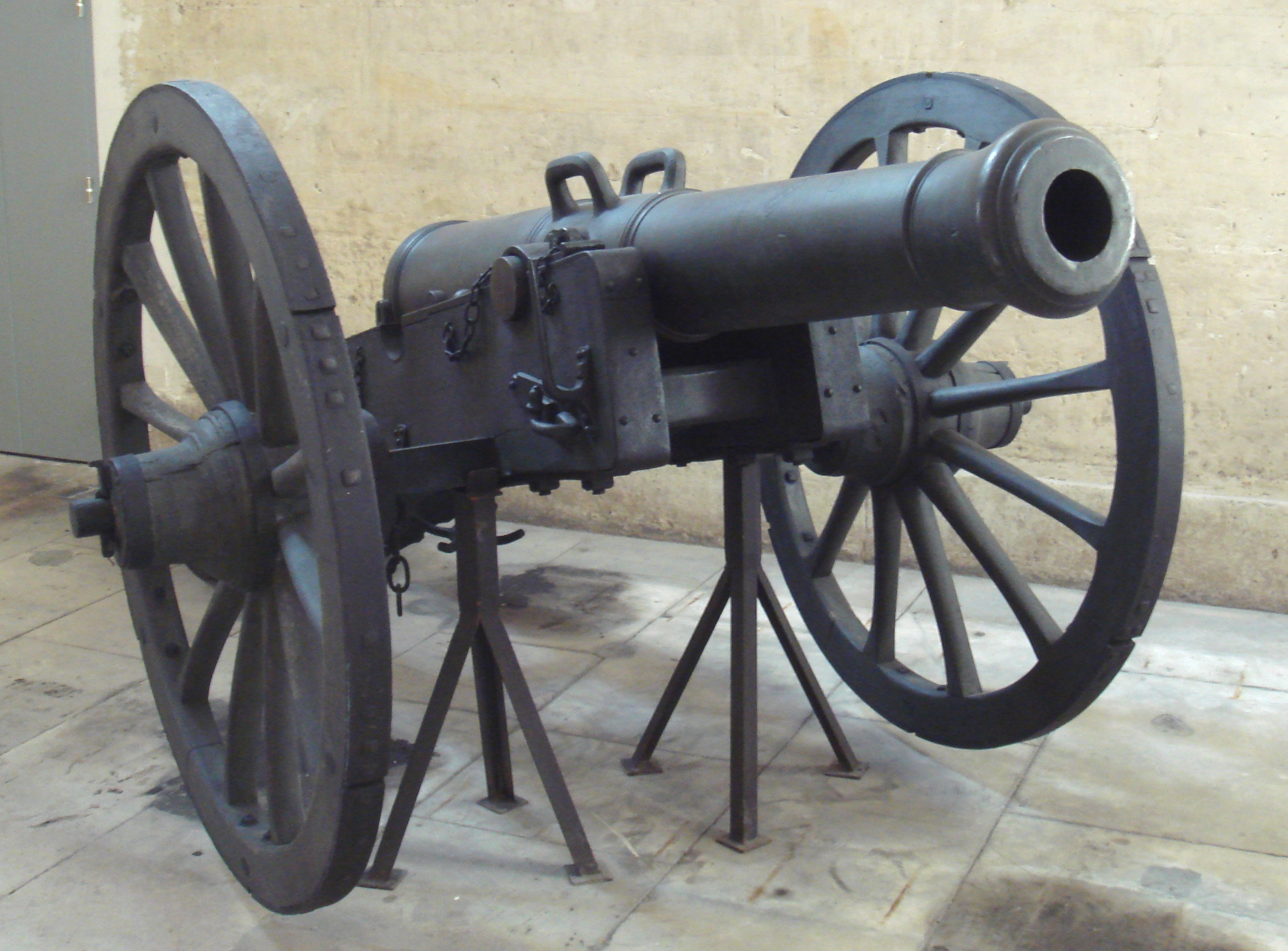
Canon de 12 Gribeauval, An 2 de la Republique (1793–1794)

Subsequently, he was for some years in disfavour at court. However, he became first inspector of artillery in 1776, in which year also he received the grand cross of the St Louis Order. He was now able to carry out the reforms in the artillery arm which are his chief title to fame. The Table des constructions des principaux attirails de l'artillerie ... de M. de Gribeauval covers all the French artillery equipment in detail. He was also responsible for the règlement for the French artillery issued in 1776. Although much of the work is not directly attributable to Gribeauval, these systems of organisation and uniformity in ordnance have been called le système Gribeauval.

== Sources ==
- Chartrand, René (2003), Napoleon's guns 1792–1815 (2), Osprey Publishing, ISBN 1-84176-460-4
- Chevalier de Passac, Précis sur M. de Gribeauval (Paris, 1816)
- Dawson, A. L., Dawson P. L. and Summerfield S. (2007) Napoleonic Artillery, Crowood Press, ISBN 978-1-86126-923-2
- Graves, Donald (2011) "Louis de Tousard and his 'Artillerists Companion': An Investigation of Source Material for Napoleonic Period Ordnance", Smoothbore Ordnance Journal, pp. 88–97, ISBN 978-1-907417-14-6
- Hennbert, Gribeauval, lieutenant-général des armées du roy (Paris, 1896)
- Hounshell, David A. (1984), From the American System to Mass Production, 1800–1932: The Development of Manufacturing Technology in the United States, Baltimore, Maryland: Johns Hopkins University Press, ISBN 978-0-8018-2975-8, LCCN 83016269, OCLC 1104810110
- Puységur in Journal de Paris, supplement of 8 July 1789
- Smith, Digby (trans.) (2011) "The 18 Questions on Austrian Artillery that Gribeauval Answered in his report Dated March 1762", Smoothbore Ordnance Journal, Issue 1, pp. 60–65, ISBN 978-1-907417-14-6
- Smith, Digby (trans.) (2011) "Biography of Jean Baptiste de Gribeauval (1715–1789) in Wurzbach 1859", Smoothbore Ordnance Journal, Issue 1, pp. 58–64, ISBN 978-1-907417-13-9
- Summerfield, Stephen (2011) "Summary of Gribeauval's Life", Smoothbore Ordnance Journal, Issue 2, pp. 9–23, ISBN 978-1-907417-14-6
- Summerfield, Stephen (2011) "Gribeauval in Austrian Service", Smoothbore Ordnance Journal, Issue 2, pp. 24–35, ISBN 978-1-907417-14-6
- Summerfield, Stephen (2011) "Gribeauval Garrison Carriage", Smoothbore Ordnance Journal, Issue 2, pp. 36–56, ISBN 978-1-907417-14-6
- Summerfield, Stephen (2011) "Gribeauval's Objection towards Regimental Artillery", Smoothbore Ordnance Journal, Issue 2, pp. 57–59, ISBN 978-1-907417-14-6
- Veyrines, (1889) Gribeauval Paris
- Wurzbach, Constant von (1859) Biographisches Lexikon des Kaiserthums Oesterreich, Volume 5, pp. 332–334
