= Canon de 12 Gribeauval =

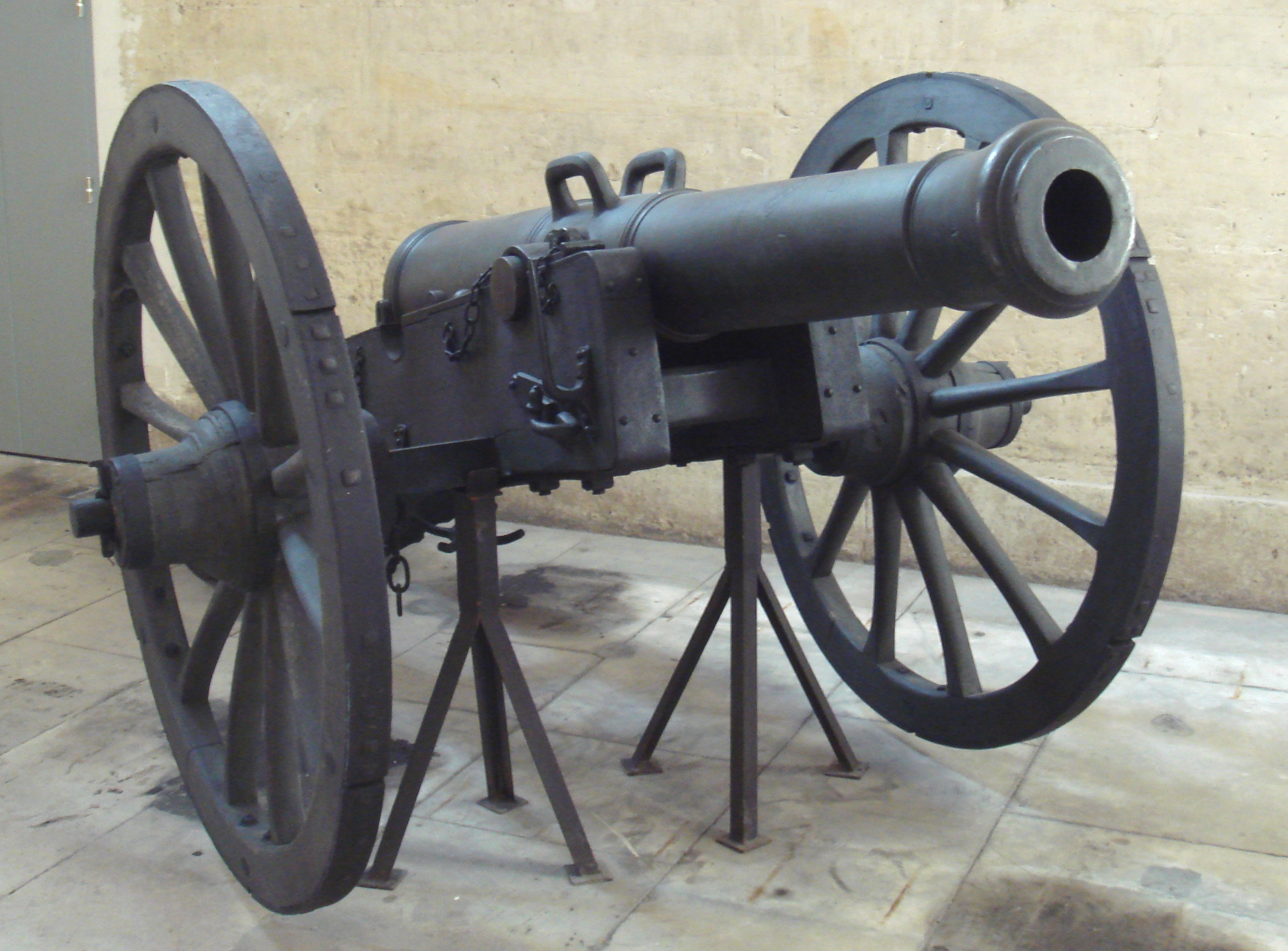
- Canon de 12 Gribeauval, An 2 de la République ("Year II of the Republic", i.e. 1793-1794), Les Invalides
- Place of origin: France

Service history
- Used by: France
- Wars: American Revolutionary War; French Revolutionary Wars; Napoleonic Wars

Production history
- Designer: Jean-Baptiste Vaquette de Gribeauval
- Designed: 1765

Specifications
- Mass: 2,172 lb (985 kg)
- Barrel length: 7 ft 7 in (231 cm)
- Crew: 15 men, 6 horses
- Caliber: 121 mm (4.8 in)
- Barrels: 1
- Carriage: 2,192 lb (994 kg)
- Rate of fire: 1 round per minute
- Effective firing range: Shot: 900 m Canister: 600 m
- Maximum firing range: 1,800 m (1,969 yd)

The Canon de 12 Gribeauval or 12-pounder was a French cannon and part of the system developed by Jean-Baptiste Vaquette de Gribeauval. There were 1.079 English pounds in the Old French pound (French: livre), making the weight of shot nearly 13 English pounds. The 12-pounder was the heaviest cannon in the French field artillery; the others were the light Canon de 4 Gribeauval and the medium Canon de 8 Gribeauval. Superseding the previous Vallière system, the Gribeauval system was adopted in 1765 and its guns were first used during the American Revolutionary War.

The greatest use of Gribeauval guns came during the French Revolutionary Wars and the Napoleonic Wars. During the latter wars, the 12-pounder was often employed in corps artillery reserves. Because of their physical and psychological effect, Emperor Napoleon increased the number of 12-pounders in his artillery and fondly called the cannons his belles filles (beautiful daughters). Gribeauval cannons fired canister shot for close-range work and round shot at more distant targets. In 1803 the Year XI system was introduced, but it only partly replaced the Gribeauval system which was not completely replaced until the Valée system was set up in 1829.

== History ==
The Gribeauval system, and the Canon de 12, was first used for major operations in the American Revolutionary War, in Jean-Baptiste Donatien de Vimeur, comte de Rochambeau's French expeditionary corps, from 1780 to late 1782, and especially at the Siege of Yorktown in 1781. The system had been adopted by the French army on 15 October 1765 but kept secret from foreign powers and conservative officers of the French Royal Army. The system included 4-, 8- and 12-pounder field pieces, the Obusier de 6 pouces Gribeauval (6-inch howitzer), and the 1-pounder light cannon. In the event, the 1-pounder was quickly abandoned. The Canon de 12 Gribeauval was used extensively during the French Revolutionary Wars and the Napoleonic Wars.

The Gribeauval system supplanted a system established in 1732 by Florent-Jean de Vallière. The earlier system lacked a howitzer and its cannons were difficult to maneuver on the battlefield. These disadvantages became manifest during the War of the Austrian Succession and the Seven Years' War. Despite this, the army's chief artillery officer Joseph Florent Vallière rigidly opposed upgrades to his father's system. Stubborn resistance by Vallière and other reactionaries held back the full adoption of the new system until 1776. Gribeauval designed lighter gun barrels and the carriages, so that his cannons were about half the weight of the Vallière pieces. Other innovations were an elevating screw, a calibrated rear gunsight and interchangeable parts for gun carriages.

Napoleon determined to replace the 8-pounders with a larger proportion of 12-pounders. In 1803 with the Year XI system, France began to cast new 6-pounder and 12-pounder cannons and 5½-inch and 6⅓-inch howitzers. By 1809 the new system was only partly established. In 1829 France adopted the Valée system which reduced the calibers of field artillery to 8- and 12-pound cannons and 24-pound and 6-inch howitzers. All batteries were organized with four cannons and two howitzers. Mobility was increased by standardizing limber sizes so that 8-pounders and 24-pound howitzers used the smaller limber while 12-pounders and 6-inch howitzers used the larger limber. The gunners no longer had to walk beside the guns; instead they rode into action while sitting atop the limbers.

== Crew ==
Six artillerists were adequate to serve a cannon, but to achieve maximum rates of fire larger crews were needed. The Canon de 12 Gribeauval was manned by a crew of 15 and drawn by 6 horses. Eight of the men were specialists. Single cannons were often commanded by a non-commissioned officer while two or more pieces were directed by an officer. The most experienced gunner stood behind and to the left, aiming and firing the cannon. A second gunner stood to the left of the cannon and loaded the cartridge and shot. The third gunner stood to the right with a rammer, mopping out the barrel after firing and ramming home a new round. Additional crewmen brought fresh ammunition to load, kept matches burning and the touch hole clear, repositioned the gun after firing, observed the fall of shot, drove the ammunition wagon (caisson) and held the horses. A trained 12-pounder crew could fire one round per minute. Higher rates of fire could be achieved in an emergency if the crew was more skillful. A team of six horses pulled the 12-pounder and a team of four hauled each caisson. French artillerists wore dark blue coats and breeches during the years 1792–1815. White gaiters were worn in the summer and black gaiters in the winter. French gun crews wore the bicorne hat until 1807, when it was replaced by the shako.

== Specifications ==
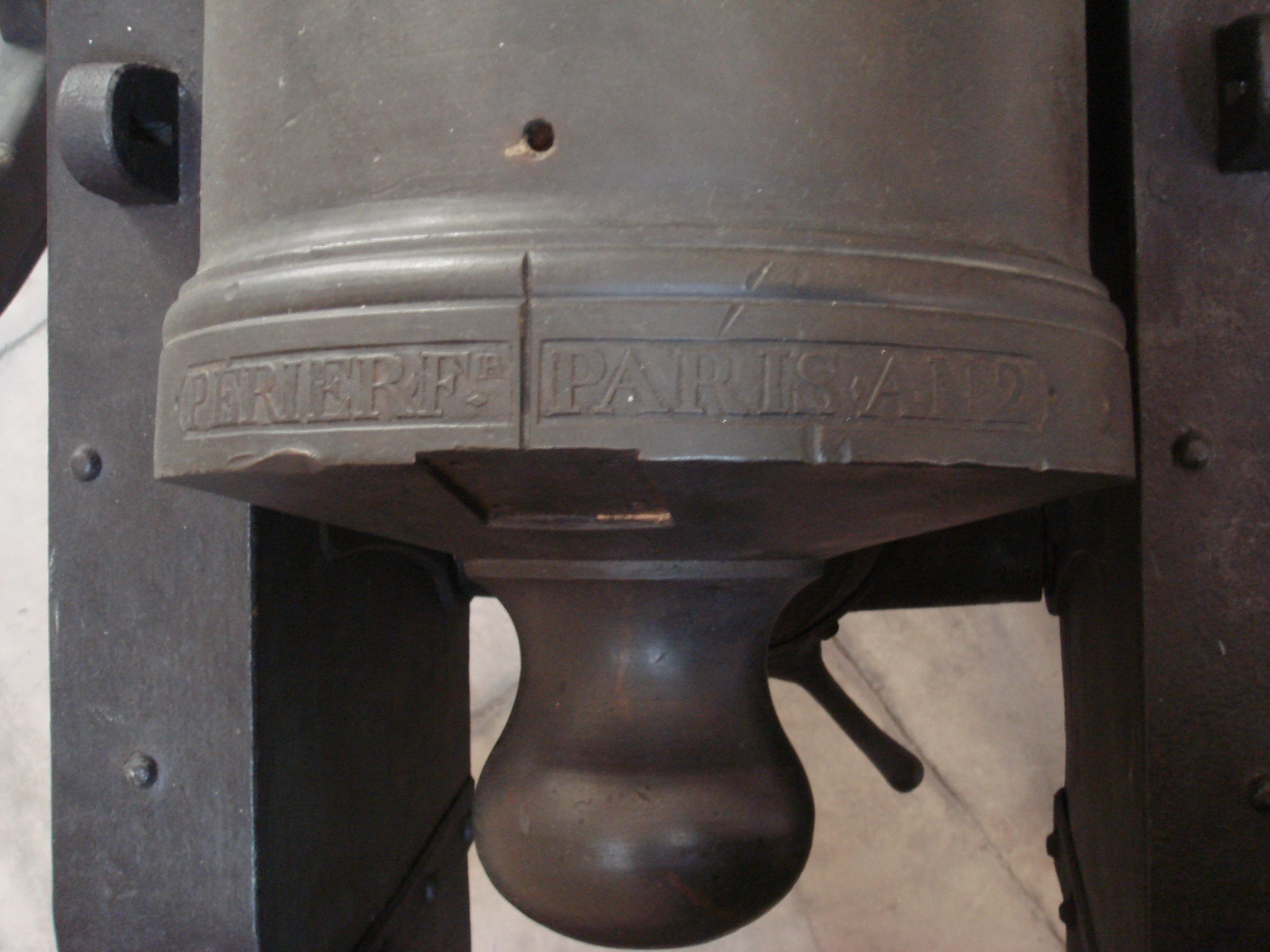
Breech inscription, Paris An 2

The Canon de 12 Gribeauval fired a round shot that weighed 12 French pounds. Commonly used until 1840, the French pound (French: livre) weighed 489.41 grams while the English pound weighed only 453.6 grams. There were 1.079 English pounds to the livre. One source stated that the barrel of the 12-pounder weighed 1,800 pounds (816 kg) or 150 times the projectile weight. The length of the cannon was 18 calibers, that is, 18 times the diameter of the bore. The carriage weighed 1,433 pounds (650 kg) and limber weighed 787 pounds (357 kg), making a total weight of barrel, carriage and limber of 4,020 pounds (1,823 kg). A second authority stated that the width of the bore was 121 millimetres (4.8 in) and the barrel length was 7 feet 7 inches (2.3 m). The barrel weighed 2,172 pounds (985 kg) and the carriage (including the limber) weighed 2,192 pounds (994 kg). All French field guns had a clearance of 2.705 millimetres (0.106 in) between the cannonball and the inside of the barrel. French 8- and 12-pounders used a special arrangement where the barrel of the cannon was shifted backward about four calibers in order to better distribute the weight while the gun was being moved.

The limber box (trail chest) held 9 round shot while the caisson carried an additional 48-round shot and 20 canister shot. Of the canister shot, 12 were larger rounds with 41 large projectiles while eight were smaller rounds with 112 small projectiles. A single 12-pounder had three ammunition wagons each holding 68 rounds. The canister round was propelled by 4.25 pounds (1.93 kg) of gunpowder while the round shot charge contained 4 pounds (1.81 kg) of gunpowder. The maximum range of the 12-pounder was 1,800 metres (1,969 yd). The effective range was 900 metres (984 yd) for shot and 600 metres (656 yd) for canister.

== Tactics ==
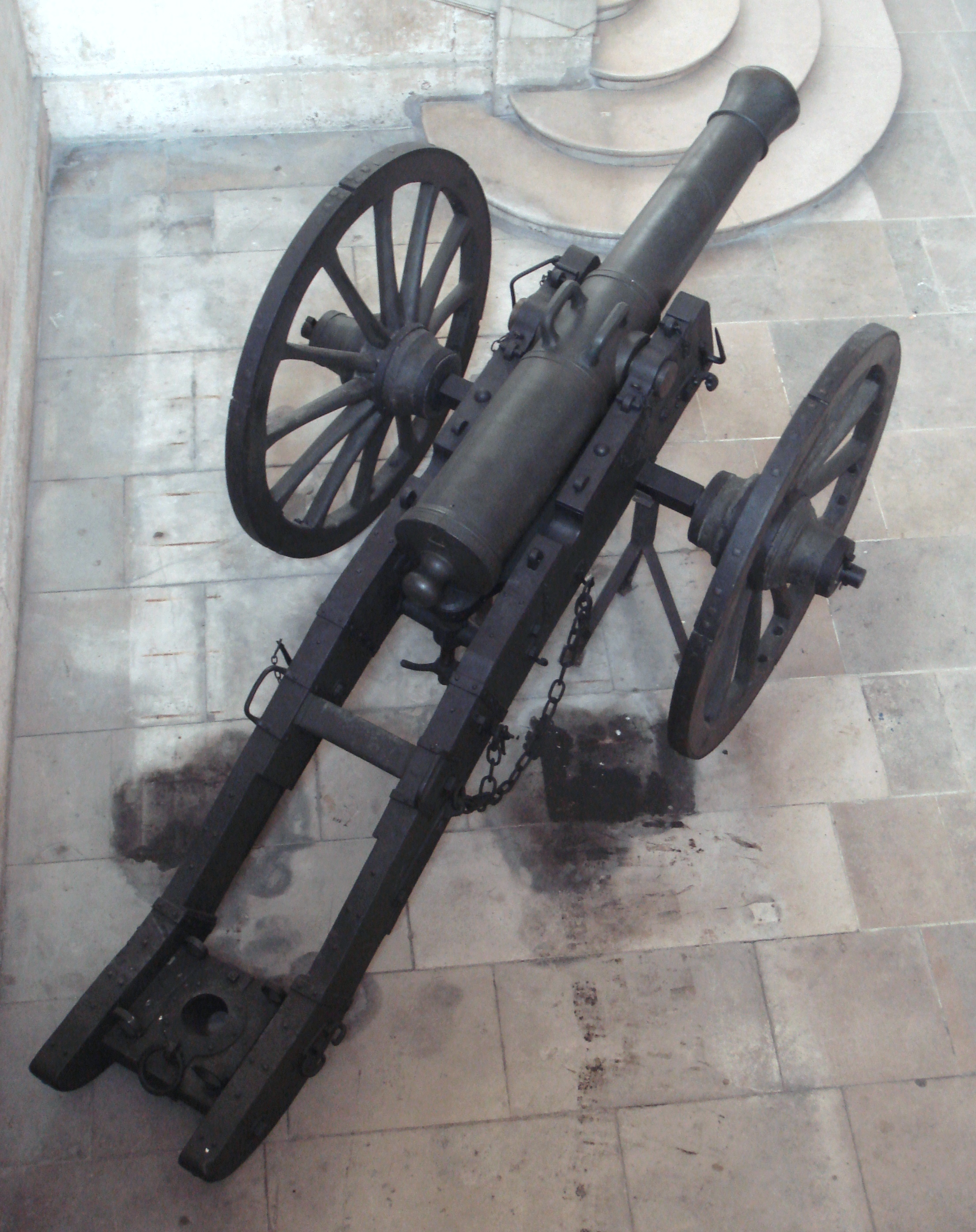
Canon de 12 Gribeauval, top view

By the French First Republic, artillery was recognized as one of the three main combat arms, alongside infantry and cavalry. During the Napoleonic era field artillery became the decisive element on many battlefields. At the crisis of the Battle of Wagram in 1809, Napoleon quickly formed a massed battery of 112 guns to fill a gap in his battle line. This stopped a dangerous Austrian attack in its tracks and helped to achieve victory.

In 1800 French armies deployed about two artillery pieces per 1,000 soldiers. The ratio approached five guns per 1,000 by 1812 as the quality of French foot soldiers declined. Under Napoleon batteries usually included eight pieces and the 12-pounder was often employed in army and corps artillery reserves. A corps reserve battery often consisted of six 12-pounders and two howitzers. Another typical organization was four cannons and two howitzers. Napoleon lovingly called the 12-pounders his belles filles and increased their number. All field pieces had similar muzzle velocities but the 12-pounders had the greatest hitting power. They also made the most frightening sound when discharged. Another attribute was their greater range. Some 8-pounders were replaced in order to increase the proportion of 12-pounders. At the Battle of Leipzig in 1813 Napoleon had 600 artillery pieces or three guns per 1,000, but the victorious Allies used 900 guns on that field.

On the battlefield, batteries were placed 600–900 paces apart for mutual support. If action was expected, the cannons would be loaded in advance and two matches kept lit. If compelled to unlimber under fire, a battery approached its selected position from a flank to present the thinnest target. When an eight-gun battery was unlimbered, the cannons fired in rotation, one every four seconds; that way the target was kept under constant fire.

The cannonball or round shot was the most frequently used projectile. Both direct and ricochet fire might be used to hit a target. Round shot was most effective when used against troops formed in column and to a lesser extent against those deployed in line. Most soldiers despised long-range artillery fire because they could not shoot back with shorter-ranged muskets. The British protected their troops from round shot by placing them behind ridgelines when possible, but all other nations normally posted their soldiers in the open. At close range, artillerists switched to canister, an anti-personnel weapon. A canister round contained a large number of musket balls that, when fired, spread out and flew in the direction of the target. When supporting an attack, the cannons advanced with the infantry. Half the guns moved forward, covered by the second half, then the second half moved up, covered by the first half. When under attack by enemy infantry, the cannons first fired at the enemy artillery. As the range closed, the guns aimed at the enemy foot soldiers.

== Historic organizations ==
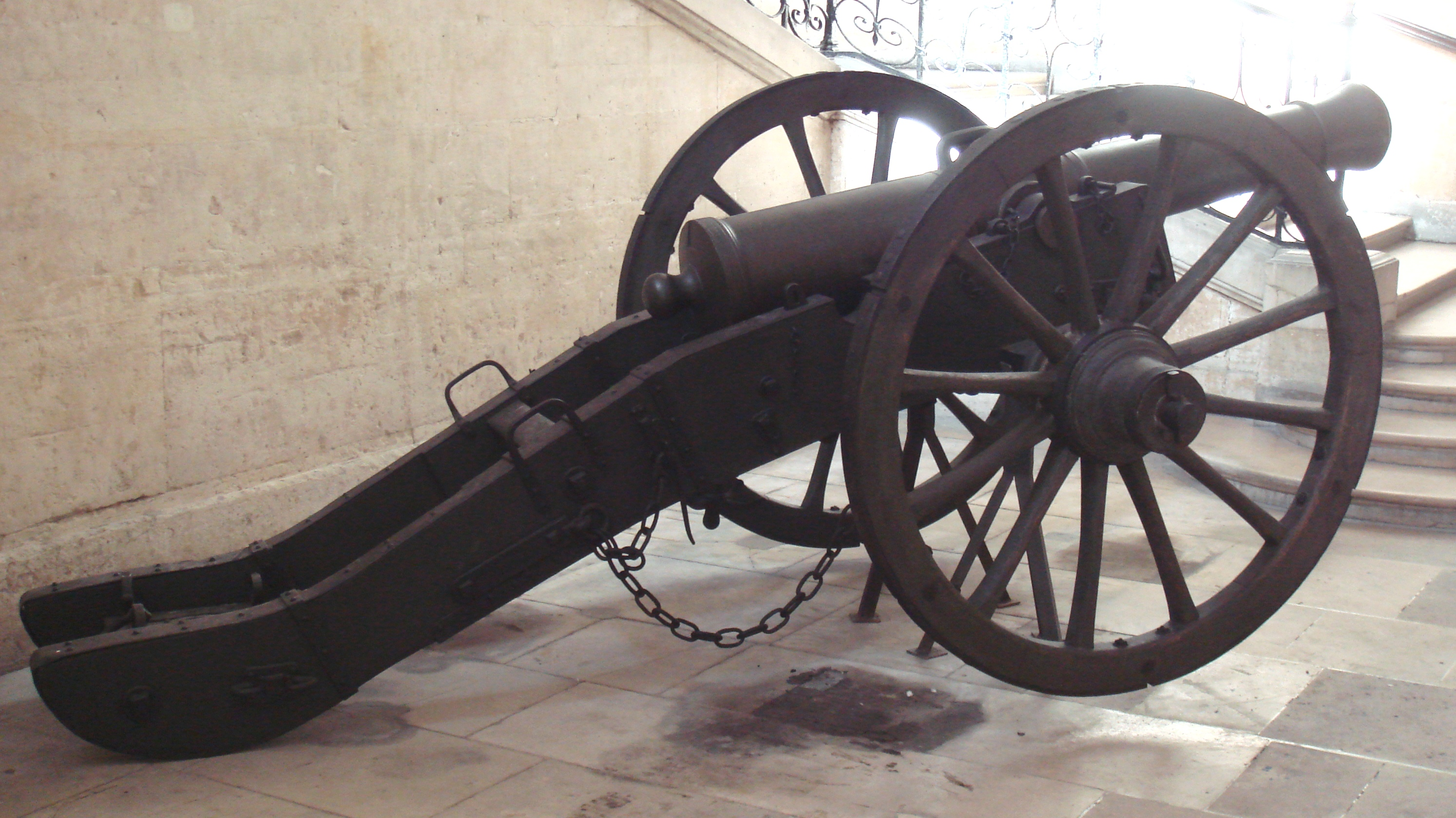
Canon de 12 Gribeauval in profile

For the War of the Fourth Coalition in 1806, Napoleon's Grand Army went to war with the following numbers of 12-pounders in each corps organization. The Imperial Guard had no 12-pounders among its 42 pieces, the I Corps had eight 12-pounders out of 50 guns, the III Corps had six of 46 pieces, IV Corps had eight of 52 guns, V Corps had eight of 38 pieces, VI Corps had four of 24 guns, VII Corps had eight of 36 guns and the Reserve Cavalry Corps had none. Two infantry divisions in IV, V and VII Corps and one infantry division in I Corps had two 12-pounders attached. The 3rd Infantry Division in IV Corps had four 12-pounders attached.

By the War of the Fifth Coalition in 1809, the 12-pounders could be found in the corps reserve artillery. At the Battle of Wagram the corps artillery was made up of the following numbers of 12-pounders. The Imperial Guard artillery included three companies each with six 12-pounders. The II Corps had three companies each with six 12-pounders and two 24-pounder howitzers. The III Corps reserve consisted of three companies each with six 12-pounders; two companies were armed with two 6-inch howitzers while the third had two 24-pounder howitzers. In the IV Corps there was one company with eight 12-pounders. The Army of Italy had one company with six 12-pounders and two 6-inch howitzers. Protecting the French base on Lobau Island was a large mass of guns under Jean Reynier including two companies each with six 12-pounders and two 24-pounder howitzers and one company with six 12-pounders.
