= Obusier de 6 pouces Gribeauval =

French artillery piece

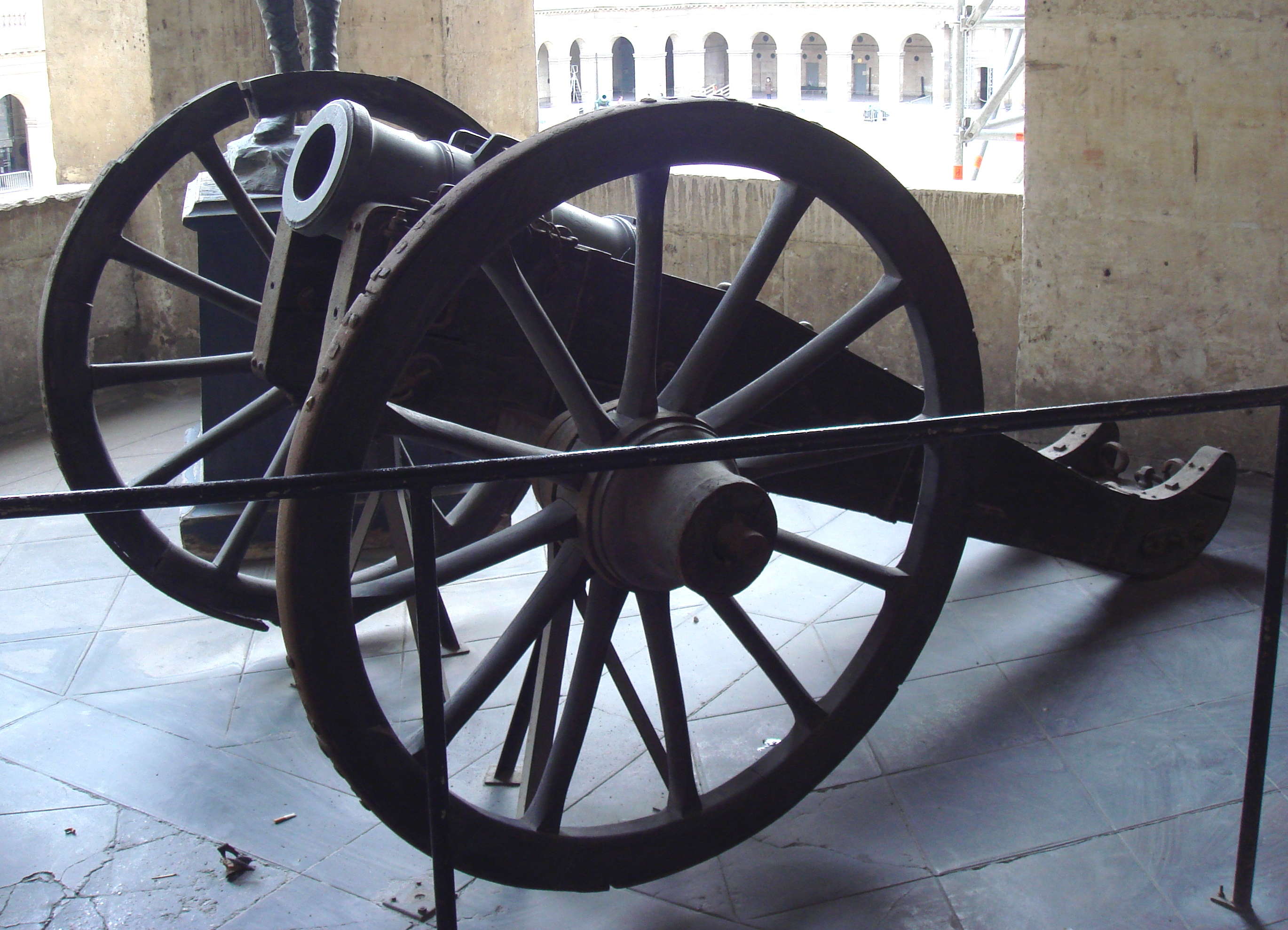
- Obusier de 6 pouces Gribeauval, modèle 1764, Year 2 (1793–1794), Les Invalides
- Place of origin: France

Service history
- Used by: France
- Wars: French Revolutionary War Napoleonic Wars American War of Independence

Production history
- Designer: Jean Baptiste Vaquette de Gribeauval
- Designed: 1765

Specifications
- Mass: 701 lb (318 kg)
- Barrel length: 2 ft 4 in (71 cm)
- Crew: 13 men, 4 horses
- Caliber: 166 mm (6.5 in)
- Barrels: 1
- Carriage: 1,895 lb (860 kg)
- Rate of fire: 1 shell per minute
- Effective firing range: Canister: 250 m (820 ft)
- Maximum firing range: Shell: 1,200 m (3,900 ft)

The Obusier de 6 pouces Gribeauval or 6-inch howitzer was a French artillery piece and part of a system established by Jean Baptiste Vaquette de Gribeauval. The Old French inch (French: pouce) was 1.066 English inches long so the weapon can accurately be described as a 6.4-inch howitzer.

The Gribeauval system included the 6-inch howitzer, the light Canon de 4 Gribeauval, medium Canon de 8 Gribeauval and the heavy Canon de 12 Gribeauval. Superseding the older Vallière system, the Gribeauval system was introduced in 1765 and the guns were first used during the American Revolutionary War. The most comprehensive employment of Gribeauval guns occurred during the French Revolutionary Wars and the Napoleonic Wars.

Two 6 in (15 cm) howitzers were often added to four or six cannons to make up a battery of artillery in Napoleon's armies. The 6 in (15 cm) howitzer was capable of firing an exploding shell at long-range targets or a canister shot at close-range enemy personnel. Starting in 1803, the Year XI system partly replaced the Gribeauval artillery, but it was not until 1829 that the Gribeauval system was wholly superseded by the Valée system.

== History ==
Adopted by the French army on 15 October 1765, the Gribeauval system was quietly introduced to keep it secret from foreign powers and to avoid a hostile reception from conservative officers in the French Royal Army. The system included 4-, 8- and 12-pounder cannons, the Obusier de 6 pouces Gribeauval (6-inch howitzer) and the 1-pounder light cannon. The 1-pounder was rapidly abandoned. The 6-inch howitzer was used extensively during the French Revolutionary Wars and the Napoleonic Wars, but its first major operational use was even earlier, during the American Revolutionary War, in General Jean-Baptiste Donatien de Vimeur, comte de Rochambeau's French expeditionary corps in 1780–1782, and especially at the Siege of Yorktown in 1781.

The Gribeauval system superseded a system developed in 1732 by Florent-Jean de Vallière. The Vallière system reduced the number of calibers and made other improvements. However, the system lacked a howitzer and the weight of its cannons made them hard to move. These problems became clear during the War of the Austrian Succession and the Seven Years' War. Nevertheless, the ranking artillery officer Joseph Florent de Vallière resisted any changes to his father's system. Sharp opposition by Vallière and other reactionaries held up full implementation of the Gribeauval system until 1776. The new artillery pieces were manufactured so that both the barrels and the carriages were lighter, so they were about half the weight of the Vallière guns. A screw to elevate the barrel, a calibrated rear gunsight and interchangeable parts for gun carriages were some other improvements.

In 1803, the Year XI system was introduced but it was only half-way established by 1809. The Year XI system included 6- and 12-pounder cannons and 5.5 in (14 cm) and 6 in (15 cm) howitzers. Gribeauval field artillery continued to be used however. In 1829 France adopted the Valée system which reduced the calibers of field artillery to 8- and 12-pound cannons and 24-pound and 6-inch howitzers. Mobility was improved by building only two limber sizes. The 8-pounders and 24-pound howitzers employed the smaller limber while 12-pounders and 6-inch howitzers used the larger limber. Instead of having to march beside the guns, the Valée system allowed all gunners to ride into action while sitting on the limbers. All batteries were standardized at four cannons and two howitzers.

== Crews ==
The Obusier de 6 pouces Gribeauval was served by 13 crewmen and drawn by 4 horses. A second authority counted 13 men in the 6-inch howitzer crew, including eight specialists. A trained howitzer crew could fire one round per minute. Normally, a single artillery piece was commanded by a non-commissioned officer while two or more were directed by an officer. The most experienced gunner stood behind and to the left of the piece; his task was to aim and fire. A second gunner was stationed to the left of the cannon; he loaded the cartridge and shell into the bore. The third gunner's station was to the right; he mopped out the barrel after a discharge and rammed home the cartridge and shell. Other crewmen were assigned to bring up fresh ammunition, keep matches burning and the cannon's touch hole clear, position the cannon to fire, observe the shell's trajectory, drive the ammunition wagon and hold the horses. Though as few as six men could operate a field piece, it was necessary to assign a larger crew in order to maintain a high rate of fire in combat.

== Specifications ==
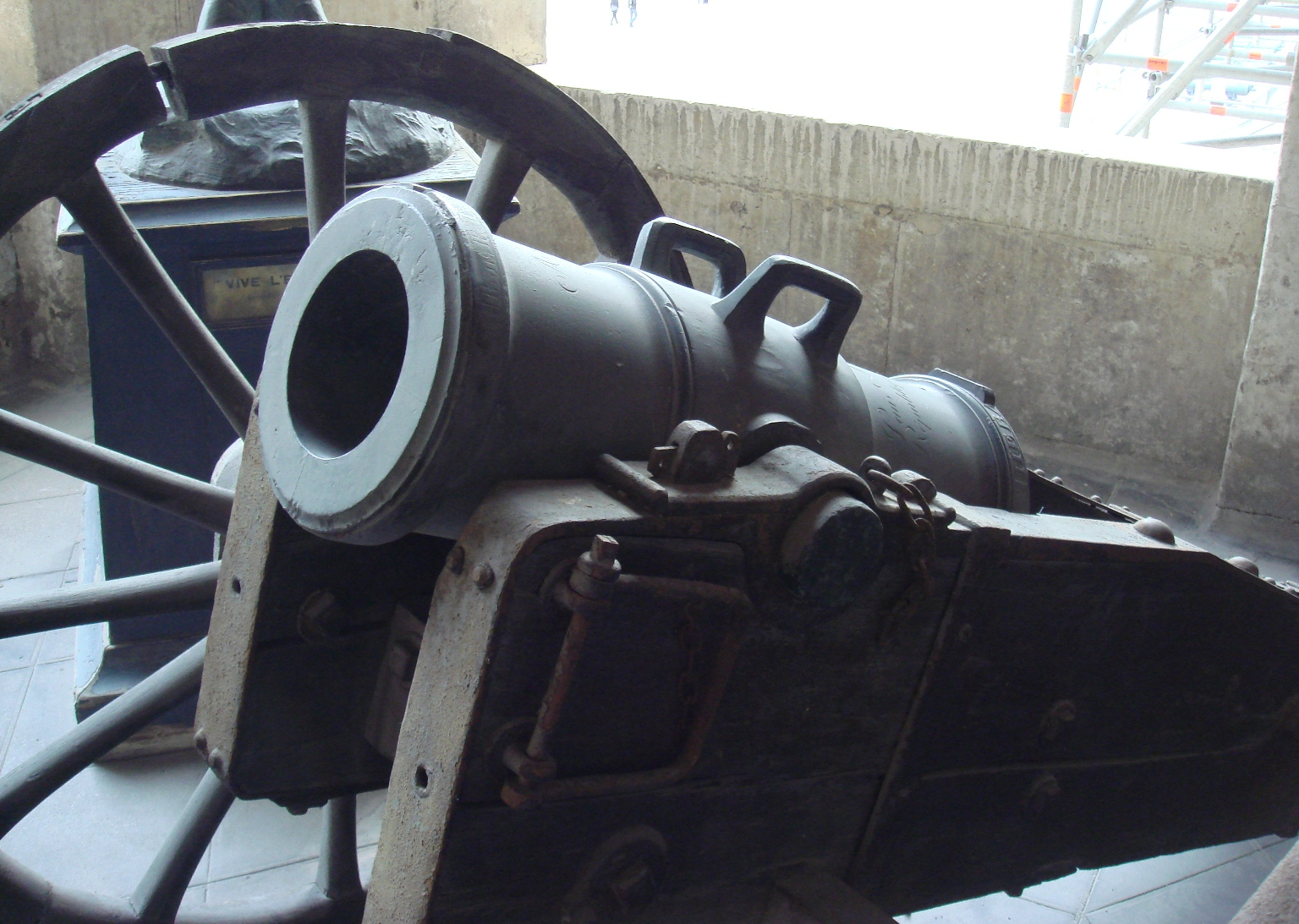
Obusier de 6 pouces Gribeauval, Les Invalides

The Obusier de 6 pouces Gribeauval fired a shell with a diameter of 6 inches. Used in the period 1668–1840, the French inch (French: pouce) measured 2.707 centimeters while the English inch was only 2.54 centimeters. One authority stated that the barrel of the 6-inch howitzer weighed 650 pounds (295 kg). A second source stated that the caliber was 166 millimetres (6.5 in) and the barrel's length 2 feet 4 inches (0.7 m). The barrel weighed 701 pounds (318 kg) and the carriage (including the limber) weighed 1,895 pounds (860 kg). All French field guns had a clearance of 2.705 millimetres (0.106 in) between the round and the inside of the barrel.

According to one authority, the trail chest (or limber box) held four shells while the caisson carried an additional 49 shells and 11 canister shot. Another source asserted that the limber box had four canister shot while the caisson held 49 shells and three canister rounds. Each canister round contained 60 balls of a large size. Three ammunition wagons holding a total of 156 rounds accompanied each howitzer. The shell was propelled by 1.0625 pounds (0.482 kg) of gunpowder. The maximum range when firing shell was 1,200 metres (1,312 yd) but the range depended on the weight of the firing charge and the fuse setting. For example, a shell weighing 23 pounds (10.4 kg) fired with a 1.75 pounds (0.79 kg) charge at 45° would carry 1200 toises, an Old French unit that measured 1.949 metres (6.4 ft). The maximum effective range for canister was 250 metres (273 yd). The effective range for shell fire was 500–600 yards (460–550 m).

The common shell consisted of a hollowed-out cast-iron ball that was filled with gunpowder. Each shell had a fuse 5 inches (12.7 cm) long that was cut by gunners to varying lengths according to the range. The trick was to cut the fuse so that the shell exploded at the target. If a fuse was cut too short the shell would burst in the air harmlessly. If the fuse was cut too long it would roll around sputtering, and there were incidents where soldiers snuffed out the fuse. An exploding shell had a kill zone of about 25 yards (22.9 m) but was less effective on soft, wet ground. The fuse was designed to ignite when the howitzer was fired. A shell fired from a distance of 1,000 paces at an elevation of 25° could be expected to strike within an area 25 paces wide and 50 paces long about 50% of the time. The same shell had only a 12.5% chance to hit an area 12 paces wide and 25 paces long. The pace used here is 0.9 metres (0.98 yd).

== Tactics ==
The French artillery was the military arm least affected by the chaos accompanying the French Revolution. By the Napoleonic Wars, the French realized that artillery had become one of the three main combat arms, together with infantry and cavalry. On a number of battlefields, the artillery won the day. As early as the Battle of Wattignies in 1793 a Coalition observer remarked that the "immense artillery" of the French was the decisive factor. French armies employed approximately two artillery pieces per 1,000 soldiers in 1800. Napoleon aimed for a ratio of five guns per 1,000, but this goal was never reached. As the quality of foot soldiers fell, the ratio was increased so that there were three guns per 1,000 men at the Battle of Leipzig in 1813. The 6-inch howitzers were commonly found in the divisional and army artillery reserves. The ideal battery was made up of eight field pieces, with six cannons and two howitzers. Batteries with four cannons and two howitzers were also seen frequently. In 1805 there were 8,320 howitzers of all types available for military use.

Howitzers were best suited for long-range fire. When howitzers and cannons were mixed in artillery batteries, the howitzers tended to be used at the shorter ranges where cannons were more effective. This led to a higher expenditure of ammunition. While artillery could be very destructive, it also exercised a psychological effect. Soldiers were frightened of long range artillery fire to which their short-ranged muskets could not respond. If possible, the British deployed their soldiers behind crests to minimize losses from artillery fire, but all other nations usually deployed their troops in the open. At close ranges, the gunners fired canister shot, an anti-personnel weapon. A canister round spewed a load of musket balls toward the target, when fired. Normally, howitzers fired shells at their targets. Unlike cannons which fired on a more flat trajectory, howitzers were designed to throw a shell on an arching trajectory.

When supporting an attack, the guns stayed 100 paces ahead of the advancing infantry until within close range. If there was no effective return fire, the cannons targeted the enemy infantry; otherwise, the guns tried to silence the enemy artillery. When advancing, the first half of the pieces moved forward, covered by the second half, then the second half moved forward, covered by the first half. If light cannons were present, they aimed at the enemy infantry while the remaining guns fired at the enemy artillery. When defending against attack by enemy foot soldiers, the cannons first fired at the enemy artillery. As the range became short, the guns began targeting at the enemy infantry. The minimum interval between artillery pieces in battery was 10 metres (11 yd) because of smoke, recoil and crowding, but the normal interval was 15–20 metres (16–22 yd). Despite being an artillerist by training, Napoleon did not appreciate the full capabilities of howitzers.

== Historic organizations ==
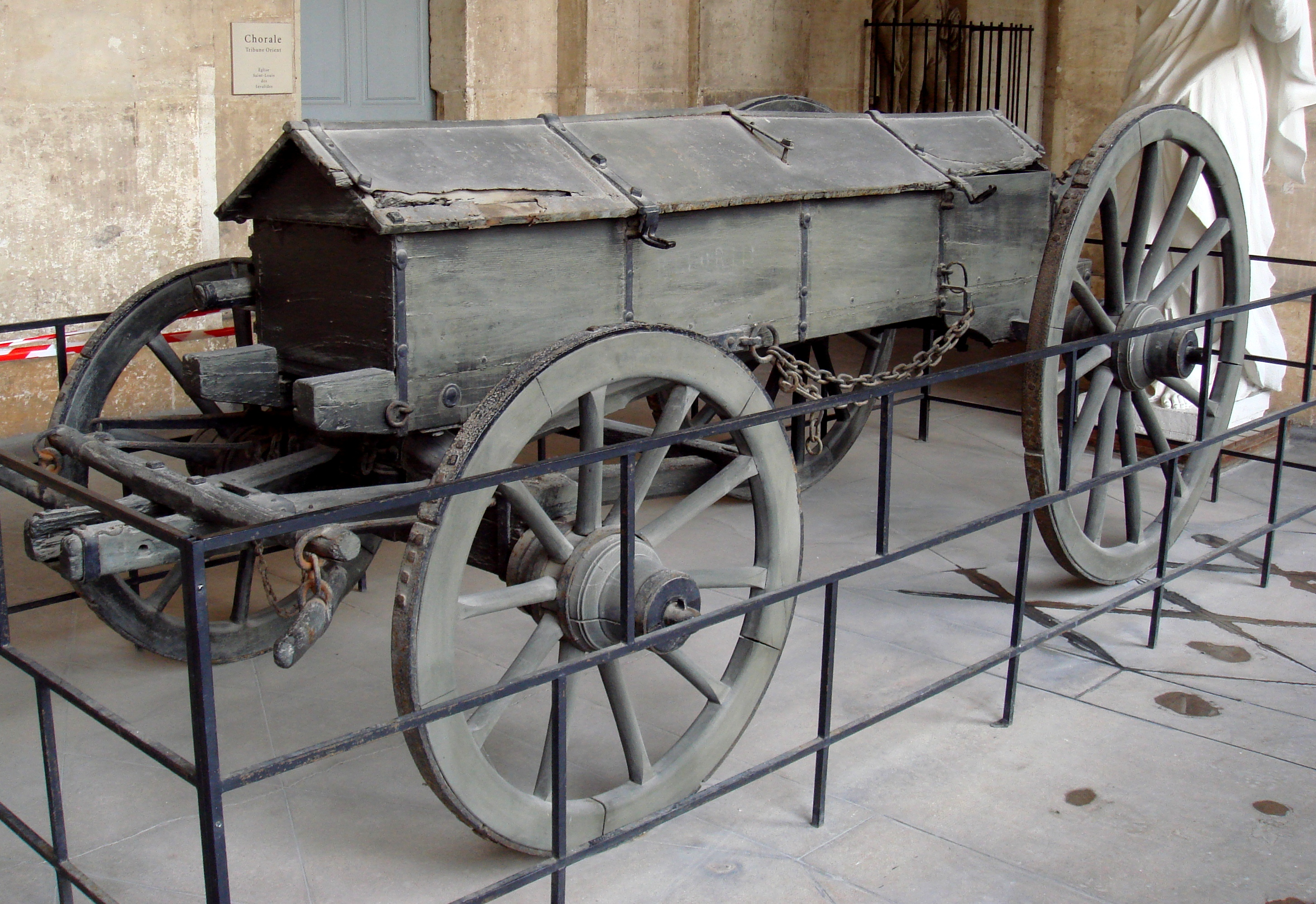
Gribeauval system ammunition wagon, Les Invalides

For the War of the Fourth Coalition in 1806, Napoleon's Grand Army went to war with the following numbers of 6-inch howitzers in each corps organization. The Imperial Guard employed eight 6-inch howitzers out of a total of 42 pieces, the I Corps had four howitzers out of 50 guns, the III Corps had six of 46 pieces, IV Corps had eight of 52 guns, V Corps had six of 38 pieces, VI Corps had four of 24 guns, VII Corps had eight of 36 guns and the Reserve Cavalry Corps had six of 18 pieces. Attached to each of the two cuirassier and four dragoon divisions was a half-battery of horse artillery composed of two 6- or 8-pounders and one 6-inch howitzer.

The 6-inch howitzer was employed at the start of the War of the Fifth Coalition in 1809. In the 2nd Division of the II Corps, the 8th Company of the 5th Artillery Regiment had six 4-pounders and two 6-inch howitzers. In the III Corps, the 4th Division artillery company had six 8-pounders and two 6-inch howitzers. The 1st Heavy Cavalry Division was assigned the 4th and 5th Companies of the 6th Horse Artillery, the 2nd Heavy Cavalry Division had the 3rd Company of the 5th Horse Artillery attached and the 3rd Heavy Cavalry Division had the 6th Companies of the 5th and 6th Horse Artillery. Each of the five horse companies were armed with four 8-pounders and two 6-inch howitzers. The IX Corps, which was made up of soldiers from the Kingdom of Saxony, had four batteries each with four 8-pounders and two 6-inch howitzers. Like France, Saxony cast its own 4-, 8- and 12-pounder cannons. In the Army of Italy, six infantry divisions were each equipped with two companies with four 4-, 6- or 8-pounder cannons and two 6-inch howitzers. Paul Grenier's division had one company with six 8-pounders and the second company with four 4-pounders and two 6-inch howitzers. Two infantry and two cavalry divisions had a single attached company that consisted of four 4- or 6-pounders and two 6-inch howitzers.

In 1809 at the Battle of Talavera the British and Spanish captured 17 French and French-allied artillery pieces from Jean François Leval's division. Among the 13 British prizes were four 8-pounders, four 6-pounders, one 4-pounder and two 6-inch howitzers. The types of the other captured pieces were not recorded. All but two of these guns were quickly recaptured by the French at the Battle of Arzobispo.

== See also ==
This website is useful for converting Old French inches (pouces) into English inches and metric equivalents. It can also convert Old French pounds (livres) into English pounds.

- Gershtein, Sergey; Gershtein, Anna (2013). "Pouce [inch] Conversion Chart (Distance and Length Conversion, Old French)".
