= Canon de 8 Gribeauval =

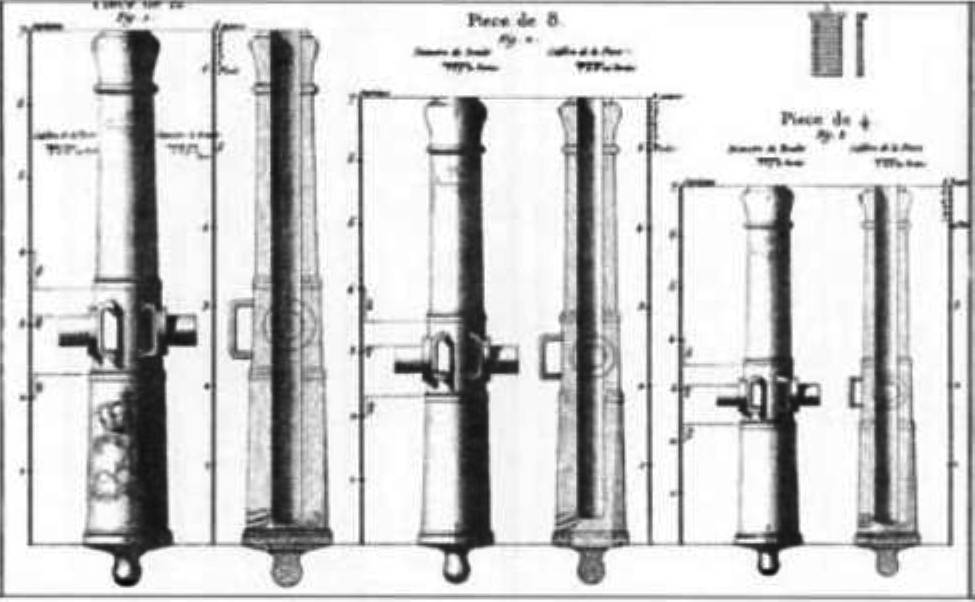
- The Canon de 8 Gribeauval, was the intermediate size between the Canon de 12 Gribeauval (left) and the Canon de 4 Gribeauval (right).
- Place of origin: France

Service history
- Used by: France
- Wars: American Revolutionary War; French Revolutionary Wars; Napoleonic Wars

Production history
- Designer: Jean Baptiste Vaquette de Gribeauval
- Designed: 1765

Specifications
- Mass: 1,286 lb (583 kg)
- Barrel length: 6 ft 7 in (201 cm)
- Crew: 13 men, 4 horses
- Caliber: 100 mm (3.9 in)
- Barrels: 1
- Carriage: 1,851 lb (840 kg)
- Rate of fire: 2 rounds per minute
- Effective firing range: Shot: 800 m Canister: 550 m
- Maximum firing range: 1,500 m (1,640 yd)

The Canon de 8 Gribeauval or 8-pounder was a French cannon and part of the Gribeauval system developed by Jean Baptiste Vaquette de Gribeauval. The Old French pound (French: livre) was 1.07916 English pounds, making the weight of shot about 8.633 English pounds (or 8 lb 10 oz). The 8-pounder was the medium weight cannon of the French field artillery; the others were the light Canon de 4 Gribeauval and the heavy Canon de 12 Gribeauval. Replacing the older Vallière system, the Gribeauval system was introduced in 1765 and the guns were first employed during the American Revolutionary War. The most extensive use of Gribeauval guns was during the French Revolutionary Wars and the Napoleonic Wars. The 8-pounder could be found in divisional reserves, advanced guards or army artillery reserves. Emperor Napoleon began to phase out the 8-pounder by increasing the proportion of 12-pounders in his artillery. The emperor began switching calibers to the handier 6-pounder piece, utilizing captured guns as well as newly designed French cannons. The Year XI system began in 1803, but it only partly replaced the Gribeauval system which was not entirely suppressed until the Valée system was introduced in 1829.

== History ==
The Gribeauval system was formally adopted by the French army on 15 October 1765 after being approved by the king in August. It was discreetly introduced to keep it secret from foreign powers and to avoid an adverse reaction from conservative officers in the French Royal Army. The system included 4-, 8- and 12-pounder field pieces, the Obusier de 6 pouces Gribeauval (6-inch howitzer) and the 1-pounder light cannon. However, the 1-pounder was quickly discarded. The Canon de 8 Gribeauval was used widely during the French Revolutionary Wars and the Napoleonic Wars. However, its first important operational use occurred in the American Revolutionary War. The new cannons were employed by the French expeditionary corps under Jean-Baptiste Donatien de Vimeur, comte de Rochambeau in 1780–1782 including the 1781 Siege of Yorktown.

The Gribeauval system replaced a system developed in 1732 by Florent-Jean de Vallière. The earlier system lacked a howitzer and its cannons were difficult to move. These shortcomings became more obvious during the War of the Austrian Succession and the Seven Years' War. Despite this, the ranking artillery officer Joseph Florent Vallière stoutly opposed innovations to his father's system. Bitter resistance by Vallière and other reactionaries delayed full implementation of the new system until 1776. Gribeauval made both the barrels and the carriages lighter, so that his cannons were about half the weight of the Vallière guns. Other improvements were a screw to elevate the barrel, a calibrated rear gunsight and interchangeable parts for gun carriages.

Napoleon determined to replace the 4-pounder with the heavier 6-pounder by using the large number of Austrian and Prussian cannons captured in 1794–1800. He also decided to replace some 8-pounders with a larger proportion of 12-pounders. In 1803 with the Year XI system, France began to manufacture new 6-pounder and 12-pounder cannons and 5½-inch and 6⅓-inch howitzers. The new system was only partly implemented by 1809. In that year, the 4-pounders were reassigned to the infantry battalions. Unfortunately, the new 6-pounder was not successful and was finally suppressed. Instead, the French relied on large numbers of captured Austrian 6-pounders.

France adopted the Valée system in 1829. The new system reduced the calibers of field artillery to 8- and 12-pound cannons and 24-pound and 6-inch howitzers. Mobility was increased by standardizing limber sizes so that 8-pounders and 24-pound howitzers used the smaller type while 12-pounders and 6-inch howitzers used the larger type. In all cases, the gunners rode into action while sitting on the limbers rather than having to walk beside the guns. All batteries were provided with four cannons and two howitzers.

== Crews ==
Any cannon could be served by as few as six gunners, but to achieve high rates of fire more men were required. René Chartrand and Ray Hutchins asserted that the Canon de 8 Gribeauval was served by 13 gunners and drawn by four horses. David G. Chandler also counted 13 men in the 8-pounder gun crews, including eight specialists. A trained 8-pounder crew could fire two rounds per minute. Digby Smith stated that the 8-pounder crew numbered 11 men. Customarily, a single cannon was directed by a non-commissioned officer while two or more guns were controlled by an officer. The most experienced gunner stood behind the cannon, aiming and firing the piece. A second gunner was positioned to the left of the cannon and loaded the cartridge and shot into the muzzle. The third gunner took position to the right, ready to mop out the barrel after firing and ram home the cartridge and shot. Other crewmen brought up new ammunition, kept matches burning and the cannon's touch hole free from debris, positioned the cannon to fire, observed the fall of shot, drove the ammunition wagon and held the horses. Smith also noted that the 8-pounder was hauled by a team of four horses.

== Specifications ==
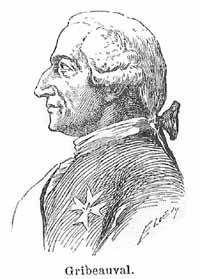
Gribeauval

The Canon de 8 Gribeauval fired a round shot that weighed 8 French pounds. Used until 1840, the French pound (French: livre) weighed 489.41 grams (1.08 lb) while the English pound weighed only 453.6 grams. One source stated that the barrel of the 8-pounder weighed 1,200 pounds (544 kg) or 150 times the projectile weight. The length of the cannon was 18 calibers, that is, 18 times the diameter of the bore. The carriage weighed 1,167 pounds (529 kg) and limber weighed 787 pounds (357 kg), making a total weight of barrel, carriage and limber of 3,154 pounds (1,431 kg). A second authority held that the width of the bore was 100 millimetres (3.9 in) and the barrel length was 6 feet 7 inches (2.0 m). The barrel weighed 1,286 pounds (583 kg) and the carriage (including the limber) weighed 1,851 pounds (840 kg). All French field guns had a clearance of 2.705 millimetres (0.106 in) between the cannonball and the inside of the barrel. French 8- and 12-pounders had a special system where the barrel of the cannon was shifted backward about four calibers so as to better distribute the weight while the gun was being hauled.

The trail chest held 15 round shot while the caisson carried an additional 62-round shot and 30 canister shot. Of the canister shot, 10 were larger rounds with 41 large projectiles while 20 were smaller rounds with 112 small projectiles. Each 8-pounder had two ammunition wagons holding a total of 184 rounds. The canister round was propelled by 2.75 pounds (1.25 kg) of gunpowder while the round shot charge contained 2.5 pounds (1.13 kg) of gunpowder. The maximum range of the 8-pounder was 1,500 metres (1,640 yd). The effective range was 800 metres (875 yd) for shot and 550 metres (601 yd) for canister.

== Tactics ==
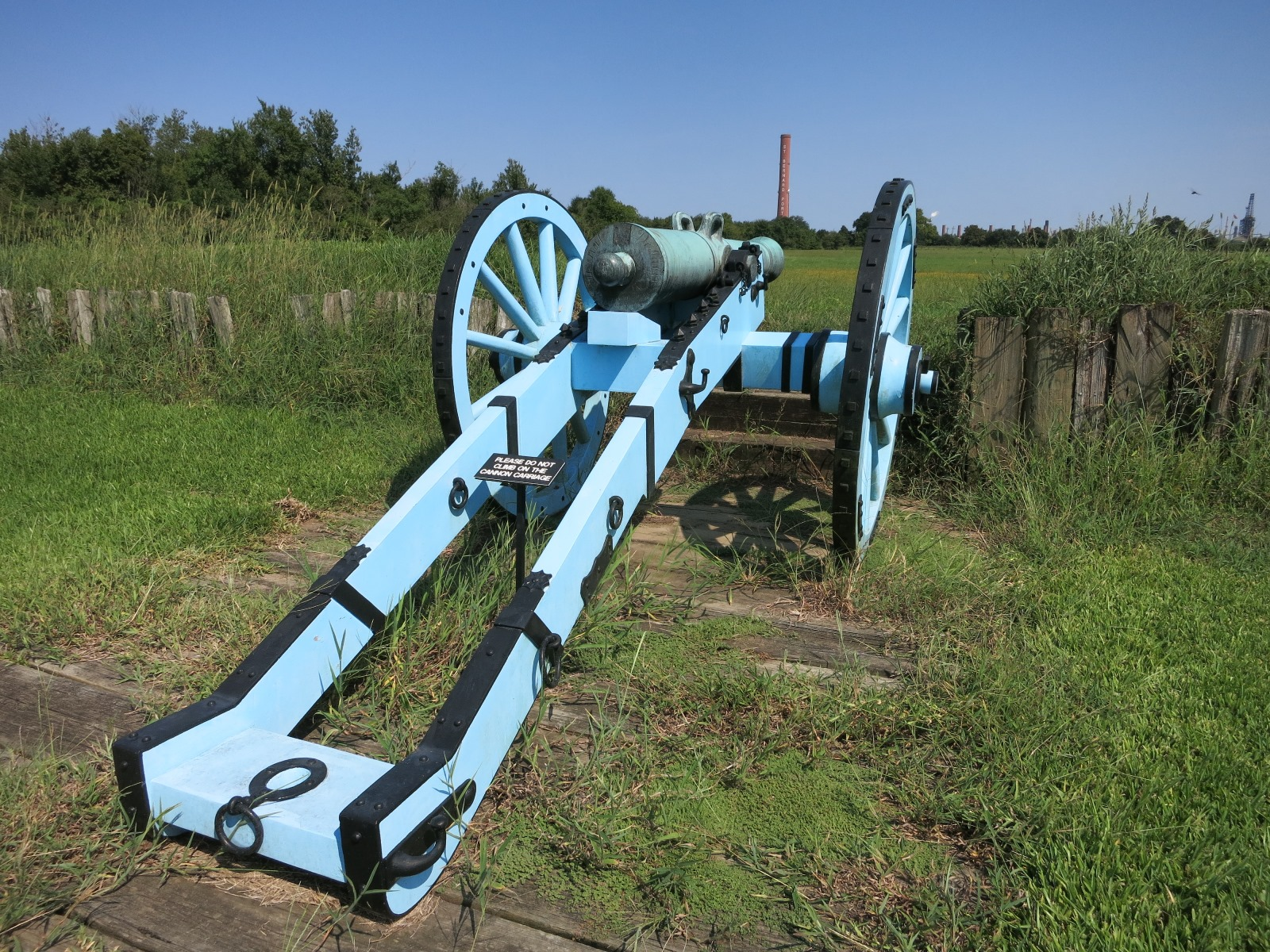
An 8-pounder Gribeauval cannon is sited in Battery 6 at Chalmette National Battlefield in New Orleans, La.

During the Napoleonic Wars, artillery became one of the three chief combat arms, alongside the infantry and cavalry. Field artillery won several of Napoleon's victories. In 1800 French armies employed about two artillery pieces per 1,000 soldiers. As the quality of foot soldiers diminished, the ratio increased to three guns per 1,000 at the Battle of Leipzig in 1813. Napoleon desired a ratio of five guns per 1,000, but this was never achieved. The 6- and 8-pounders were often attached to advanced guards and divisional reserves, but as many as half of these guns were found in the army artillery reserve. Later, Napoleon began to replace some 8-pounders with 12-pounders to take advantage of the heavier piece's greater range and impact. Under Napoleon, batteries ideally contained eight pieces, including six cannons and two howitzers. Another common configuration was four cannons and two howitzers.

The cannonball or round shot was the projectile most often used. Both direct and ricochet fire could be used to hit a target. Round shot was most effective when used against formed troops in column and was somewhat less effective against troops in line. Soldiers were frightened of long range artillery fire because their short-ranged muskets could not retaliate against the gunners. The British deployed their soldiers on reverse slopes when possible to avoid losses from artillery fire, but all other nations generally arrayed their soldiers in the open. However, when under a severe bombardment by 50 Austrian guns at the Battle of Aspern-Essling, the French Imperial Guard redeployed from a 3-deep line to a 1-deep line to minimize losses and keep the appearance of a solid front. At closer ranges, the gunners switched to canister, an anti-personnel weapon. When canister was fired, its load of musket balls flew toward the target while spreading out.

If supporting an attack, the cannons kept 100 paces ahead of the advancing infantry until within close range. If there was no effective return fire, the cannons targeted the enemy infantry; otherwise, the guns tried to suppress the enemy artillery. When advancing, the first half of the guns moved forward, covered by the second half, then the second half moved forward, covered by the first half. If 4-pounders were present they fired at the enemy infantry while the 8-pounders and heavier guns targeted the enemy artillery. When defending against attack by enemy foot soldiers, the cannons first fired at the enemy artillery. As the range closed, the guns began aiming at the enemy foot soldiers. Artillery pieces in battery were never placed closer than 10 metres (11 yd) apart because of smoke, recoil and crowding; the usual interval was 15–20 metres.

== Historic organizations ==
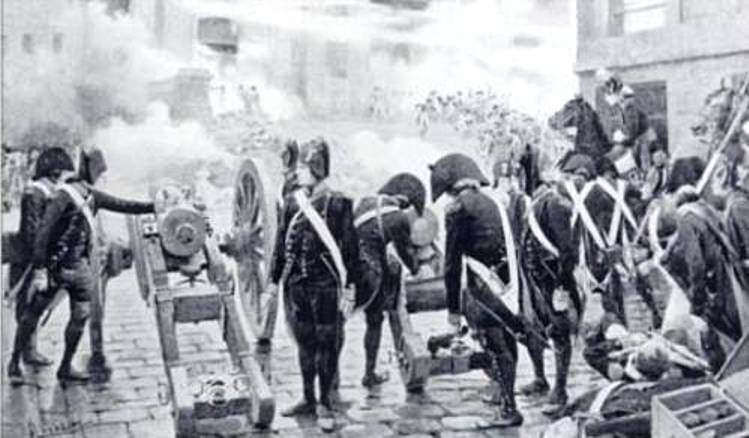
Napoleon Bonaparte's cannons put down an October 1795 attempted coup in Paris. The two cannons in the sketch are almost wheel to wheel; the minimum gap between guns was normally 10 meters.

At the Battle of Marengo in 1800, Jean Boudet's division had four 8-pounders and four 4-pounders manned by the 3rd and 4th Companies of the 2nd Horse Artillery Regiment. The division of Jean-Charles Monnier was equipped with one 8-pounder and one howitzer crewed by the 5th Company of the 1st Artillery Regiment and two captured 3-pounders manned by 10th Company of the 6th Artillery Regiment. The Consular Guard had two 8-pounders and one howitzer.

For the War of the Fourth Coalition in 1806, Napoleon's Grand Army went to war with the following numbers of 8-pounders in each corps organization. The Imperial Guard employed 20 8-pounders out of a total of 42 pieces, the III Corps had 23 of 46 guns, V Corps had six of 38 pieces, VI Corps had 12 of 24 guns, VII Corps had 12 of 36 guns and the Reserve Cavalry Corps had eight of 18 pieces. Attached to each of the four dragoon divisions was a half-battery of horse artillery composed of two 8-pounders and one 6-inch howitzer. The I Corps and IV Corps had no 8-pounders in their artillery batteries; the medium cannons were replaced by 6-pounders.

The 8-pounder was employed at the start of the War of the Fifth Coalition in 1809. In the 1st Division of Nicolas Oudinot's II Corps, the 4th Company of the 7th Artillery Regiment had two 8-pounders and six 4-pounders. The corps artillery reserve included the 5th Company of the 3rd Artillery with four 8-pounders, two 4-pounders and two 5½-inch howitzers. In the III Corps, the infantry divisions each had a company of foot artillery attached. The 1st and 2nd Division companies each had six 8-pounders and two 6-pounders, the 3rd Division company had six 8-pounders and the 4th Division company had six 8-pounders and two 6-inch howitzers. The 1st Heavy Cavalry Division was assigned the 4th and 5th Companies of the 6th Horse Artillery, the 2nd Heavy Cavalry Division had the 3rd Company of the 5th Horse Artillery attached and the 3rd Heavy Cavalry Division had the 6th Companies of the 5th and 6th Horse Artillery. Each of the five companies were equipped with four 8-pounders and two 6-inch howitzers. The IX Corps, which was made up of soldiers from the Kingdom of Saxony, had four batteries each with four 8-pounders and two howitzers. Like France, Saxony manufactured its own 4-, 8- and 12-pounder cannons. In the Army of Italy four foot artillery companies were armed with four 8-pounders and two 6-inch howitzers. These companies were attached to the divisions of Jean-Mathieu Seras, Jean-Baptiste Broussier, Gabriel Barbou des Courières and Jean Maximilien Lamarque. In Paul Grenier's division the foot artillery company had six 8-pounders. The other four infantry divisions had foot companies equipped with 6-pounders.

During the Battle of Talavera in 1809, the British and Spanish captured 17 French guns from Jean François Leval's division. Among the 13 British prizes were four 8-pounders, four 6-pounders, one 4-pounder and two 6-inch howitzers. The weights of the other captured pieces were not reported. All but two guns were soon recaptured by the French at the Battle of Arzobispo.

The weapon was still being used in the 1814 Campaign. At the Battle of Montereau on 17–18 February, Michel Marie Pacthod's National Guard division was supported by two 8-pounders and four 4-pounders. On 1 March in the XI Corps, the artillery company of François Pierre Joseph Amey's 2nd Division counted four 8-pounders and one howitzer while the corps artillery reserve numbered 15 12-pounders, four 8-pounders, 17 6-pounders and 12 24-pounder howitzers. On 15 March in the French Army of the Rhône, the artillery companies of Louis François Félix Musnier's 1st and Alexandre, vicomte Digeon's Cavalry Divisions were each armed with two 8-pounders, two 4-pounders and two 6-inch howitzers. Claude Marie Joseph Pannetier's 2nd Division artillery company consisted of two 8-pounders and two 4-pounders and Jean-Jacques Desvaux de Saint-Maurice's Artillery Reserve had two 8-pounders and four 4-pounders.

At the Battle of Palo Alto on 8 May 1846, the Mexican army employed at least twelve 4-pounder and 8-pounder Gribeauval guns against the United States Army. (Note: The Gribeauval guns at the Chalmette National Battlefield are probably trophies captured during the Mexican–American War after the obsolete guns were sold to Mexico by France.)

== Notes ==
Footnotes

Citations

== See also ==
This website is useful for converting Old French pounds (livres) into English pounds and metric equivalents. It can also convert Old French inches (pouces) into English inches.

- Gershtein, Sergey; Gershtein, Anna (2013). "Livre Conversion Chart (Weight and Mass Converter, Old French)".
