= Obusier de 15 cm Valée =

French Artillery 6-inches howitzer

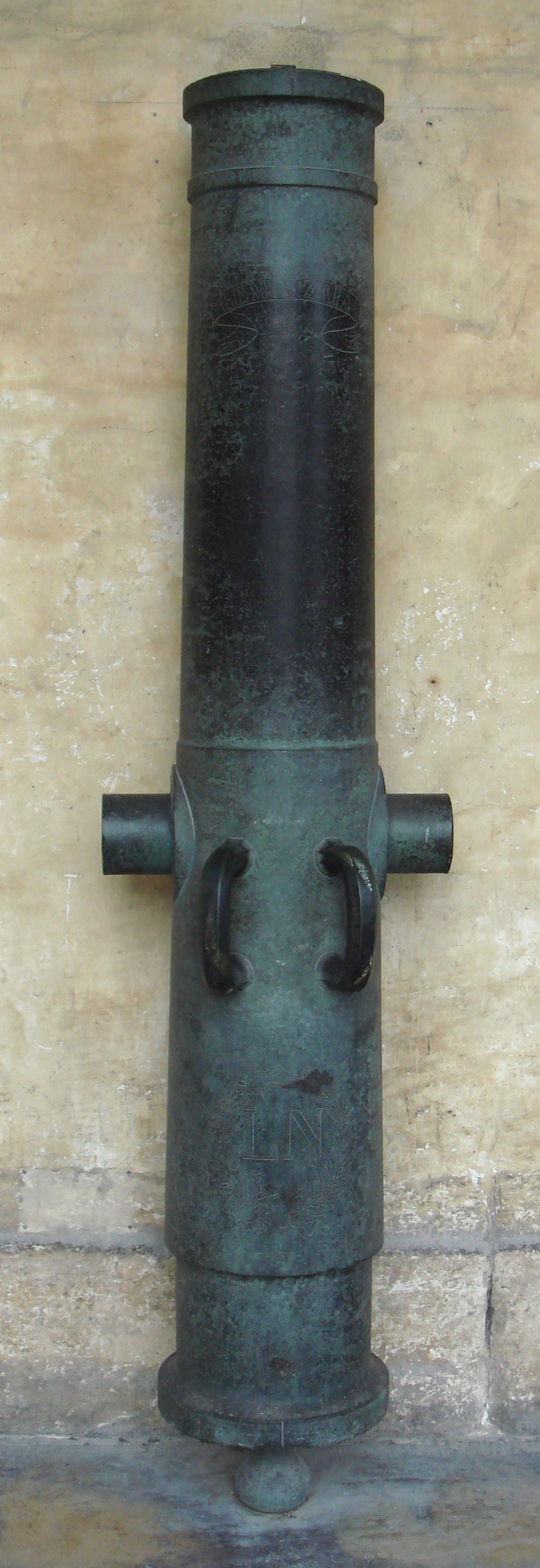
- Obusier de 15 cm Valée, Le Mouzaia, modèle 1828, founded in 1852 in Douai. Les Invalides
- Place of origin: France

Service history
- Used by: France

Production history
- Designer: Sylvain Charles Valée
- Designed: 1828

Specifications
- Mass: 587 kg (1,294 lb)
- Barrel length: 1.71 m (5 ft 7 in)
- Shell: shell within sabot, 7.7 kg (17 lb)
- Caliber: 151 mm (5.9 in)
- Barrels: 1

The Obusier de 15 cm Valée, was a French Artillery 6-inches howitzer belonging to the Valée system (French:"Système Valée") of artillery developed between 1825 and 1831 by the French artillery officer Sylvain Charles Valée.

== Specifications ==
The Valée system consisted in various technical improvements to the Gribeauval system. The system mainly improved the mobility of the artillery train, and simplified maintenance by standardizing limber usage and wheel size, and reducing the number of carriage types to two. It also allowed for cannoniers to be able to sit on the ammunition chests of the battery itself during transportation, allowing the whole artillery train to move as fast as the infantry or cavalry.

Valée also improved the guns themselves slightly, by making them lighter, and with a longer range.

The complete Valée system consisted in siege guns of 24 in (61 cm) and 16 in (41 cm), and field guns of 12 in (30 cm) and 8 in (20 cm). It also included field howitzers of 24 in (61 cm) and 6 in (15 cm), and a siege howitzer of 8 in (20 cm). Mountain artillery pieces were of 12 in (30 cm) caliber. Mortars were of 12 in (30 cm), 10 in (25 cm), and 8 in (20 cm), with a 15 in (38 cm) stone mortar.

== Deployment ==
French artillery would be reorganized along the Valee system in 1827. The "Valée system" would be used at the Capture of Alger (1830) and the Fall of Constantine (1837), as well as during the Crimea War (1853–1856).

An American version of the Valee system was also developed. Some pieces are visible at the Concord Battery, Concord, Massachusetts.
