= Sylvain Charles Valée =

French artillery officer (1773–1846)

Marshal of France Sylvain Charles Valée 1st Count Valée
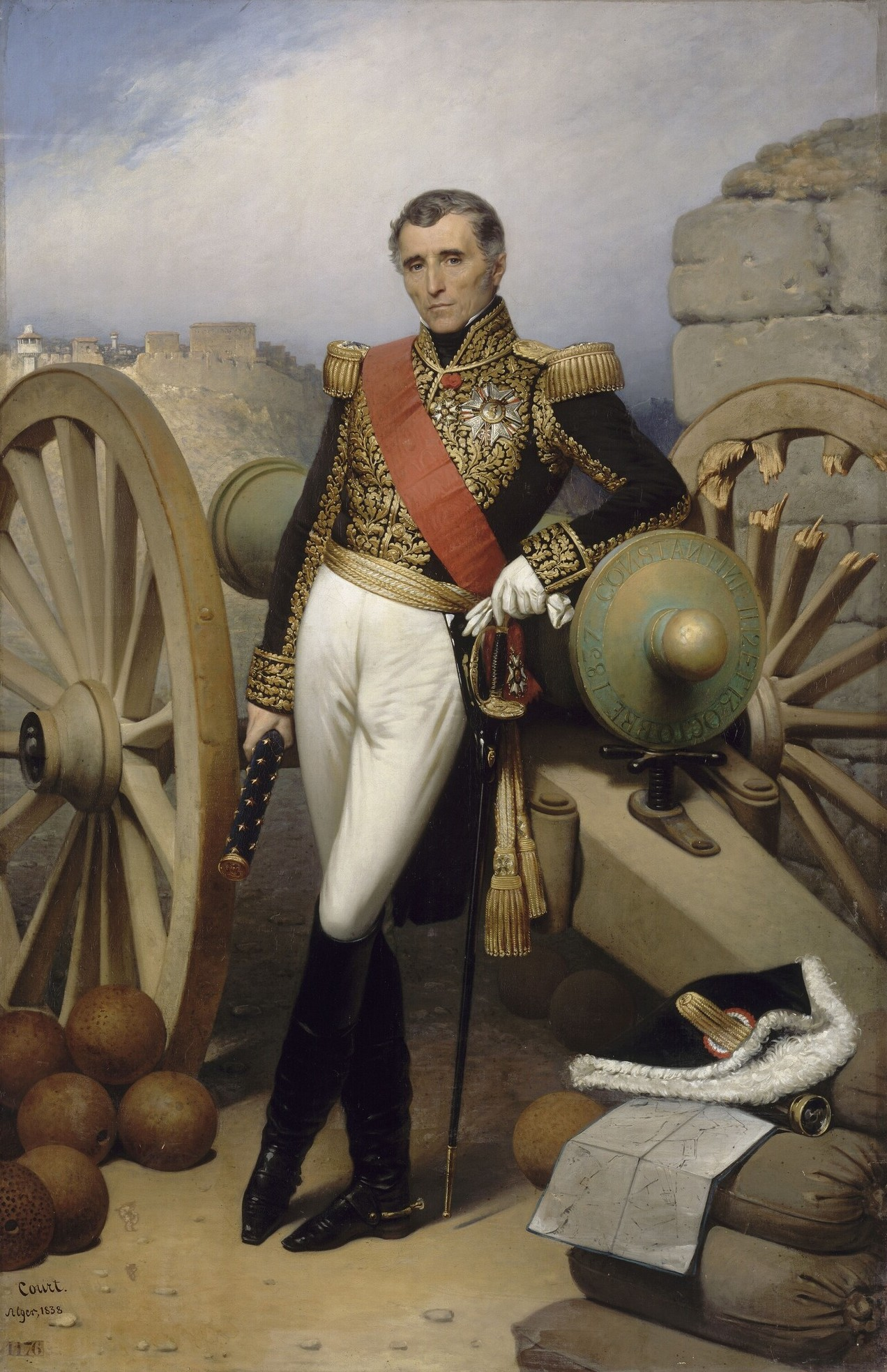
- Portrait of Sylvain Charles Valée, by Joseph-Désiré Court, c. 1838
- Born: 17 December 1773; Brienne-le-Château, France
- Died: 16 August 1846 (aged 72); Paris, France
- Military career
- Allegiance: First French Republic; First French Empire; Bourbon Restoration; July Monarchy
- Branch: French Army
- Service years: 1792–1846
- Rank: Maréchal de France
- Commands: 1st Artillery Regiment
- Wars: War of the First Coalition; War of the Fourth Coalition; Peninsular War; Hundred Days; French conquest of Algeria

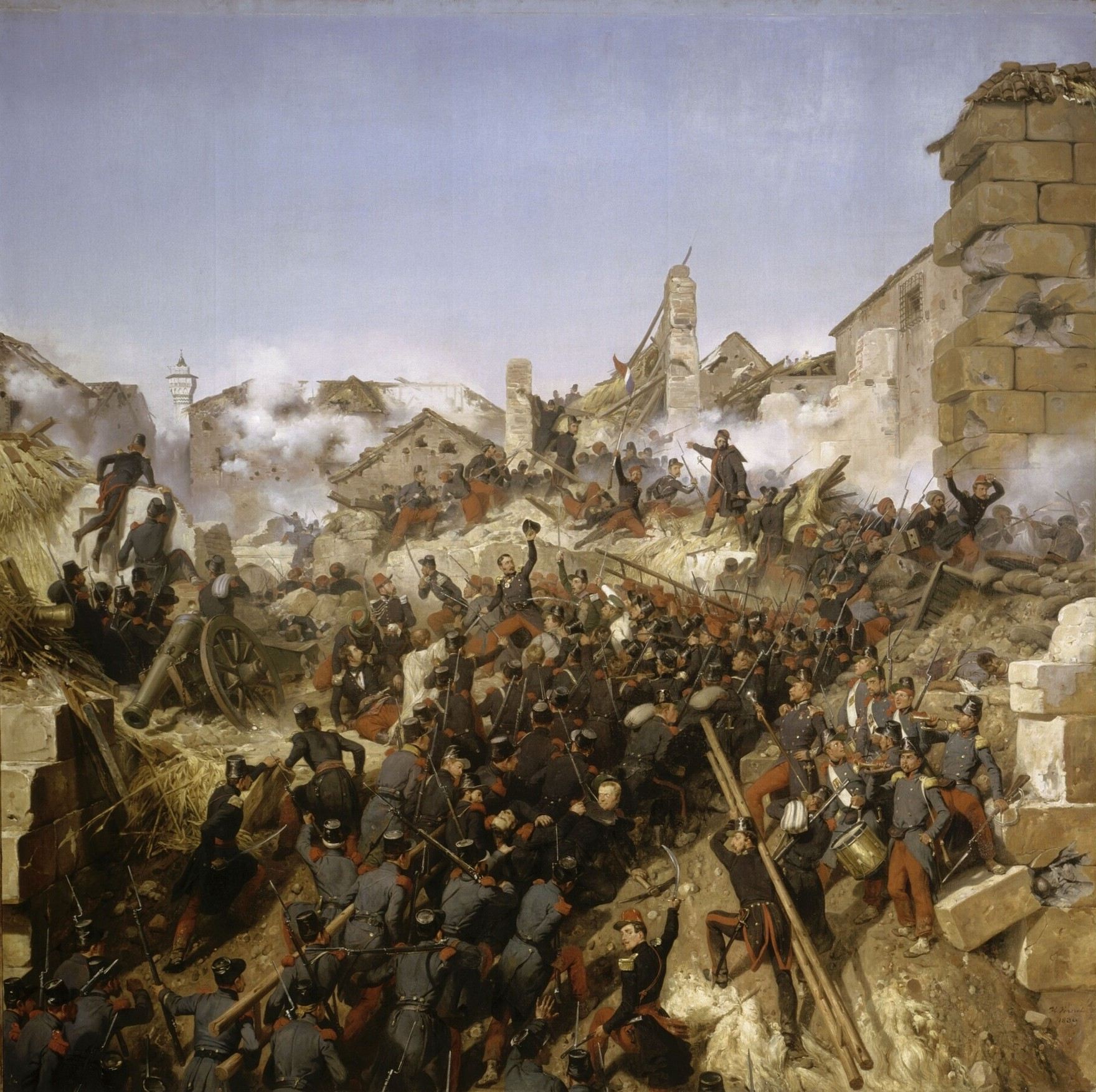
Valée led the capture of Constantine by French troops on 13 October 1837. The Siege of Constantine by Horace Vernet, 1838

Sylvain-Charles, comte Valée (17 December 1773 – 16 August 1846), born in Brienne-le-Château, was an artillery officer who served Republican France, the Empire and the restored Bourbons. Best known for his efforts to reform French artillery arm into the Valée system. He would become a Marshal of France for his service in the conquest of Algeria.

== Service in the Revolutionary and Napoleonic wars ==
Upon the outbreak of the French Revolution, Valée enlisted in the French revolutionary army, joining the Châlons Artillery School as a second lieutenant of artillery in September 1792. Made lieutenant in the 1st Foot Artillery Regiment on June 19, 1793 in the Army of Sambre-et-Meuse.

Promoted to captain and transferred to a Horse Artillery Regiment in 1795 he fought in the Rhine campaign of 1799-1800 including fighting at the Rhine crossing at Neuwied, promoted during the campaign he would take over as commander of the artillery for General Charles Mathieu Isidore Decaen's division seeing action at Hohenlinden.

When the war of the third coalition broke out in 1805 he held the rank of lieutenant colonel and was assigned as the inspector general of the train of the artillery reserve of the Grande Armée in this role he fought at Ulm, Austerlitz and Jena, distinguishing himself at Jena. In November 1806 Valée was made chief of staff of artillery of the Grande Armée. Valée was made colonel in a few months later along with command of the 1st Artillery Regiment which he led in the 1808 campaigning season.

In 1809, Valée was sent to Spain seeing service at the siege of Zaragoza before being made commander of the artillery of the III Corps in Spain, where he distinguished himself in the sieges of Lleida, Tarragona, Tortosa, and Valencia. In 1811 Valée was promoted to général de division and in 1814 Napoleon created him a count.

With the restoration of the House of Bourbon to the throne of France, Valée was made Inspector-General of the artillery. Although Napoléon upon his return from Elba made him commander of the artillery of the 5th military division.

Inspector General of the 3rd Artillery District in Strasbourg, June 21; Commander of the artillery in the 5th Military Division in Strasbourg, March 27, 1815; Commander of the reserve artillery in Vincennes, May 6.

== Under the restored Bourbons ==
After the failure of the Waterloo campaign and the second restoration, Valée was retained by Louis XVIII seeing a promotion to Inspector-General of the artillery in Paris. In this position he began reorganising the French artillery, implementing the "Valée system".

The Valée system represented an incremental technical improvements on the Gribeauval system and Napoleon's own Year XI system. The system mainly improved the mobility of the artillery train, and simplified maintenance standardising limbers and wheels as well as reducing the number of carriage types to two. The improvements in totality made maintenance easier and allowed the artillery to move as fast as the infantry or cavalry.

Valée also improved the guns themselves slightly, by making them lighter, and with a longer range.

The system would last until technological advances in the 1850s rendered it obsolete.

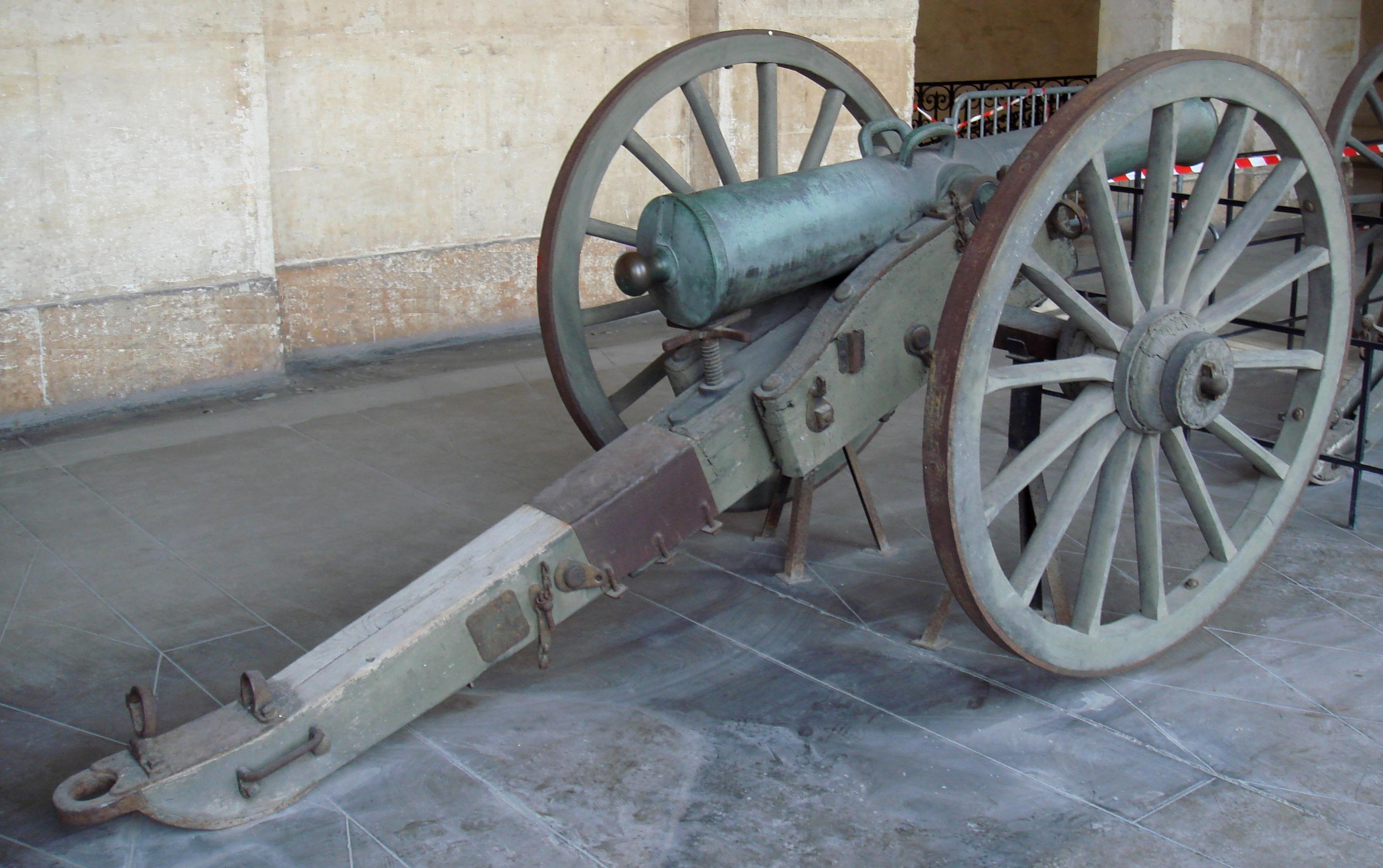
Canon de 12 of the Valée system with carriage, 1854.

Valée served as president of the 2nd Council of War of the 1st Military Division, charged with judging General Charles Lefebvre-Desnoüettes condemning him to death in May 1816.

He was made a member of the High Council of the War, and Inspector General of the whole Artillery Service in February 1828. Elevated to Frances upper chamber as a Peer of France, January 27, 1830 (this appointment was annulled by Article 6 of the 1830 Charter following the July revolution).

== July revolution and service in Algeria ==
The July revolution saw another change in government in France, Valée was put on the non active list in September 1830. But even under the Orléans monarchy Valée's skill for the management and reform of artillery and he returned to active service to work within committees and was recognised for his services being returned to the dignity of his peerage in 1835. In 1837 when the need arose for an experienced artillery general, Valée was reinstated on the active service list and sent to Algeria as commander-in-chief of the artillery of the province of Bône.

He commanded the artillery in the expedition against Constantine, and after the death of the army's commander, general Charles-Marie Denys de Damrémont, Valée took over command and captured the city the following day, a feat which gained him the Marshal's baton.

Valée was then made governor-general and in 1839 organised the Iron Gates expedition this restarted the war between France and Abd-el-Kader. While victorious in some minor engagements, around Boufarik and the Mouzaïa pass he oversaw French forces occupying Cherchell, Medea and Miliana. But these did not quell the uprising and in fact only gave the French greater garrisoning requirements that complicated their task in suppressing Abd el-kader's insurgency. In 1840 Valée was replaced by General Bugeaud, who would take a different strategy to Valéé. While Valéé had focused on subduing major population centres, focusing on large calibre artillery, Bugeaud focused on lighter forces often equipped with more mobile mountain guns it was with such innovations in tactics that Bugeaud brought the conquest to a conclusion.

During his time in Algeria Valée founded Philippeville, and re-built the largest Roman theatre in Algeria in the town. It was built upon the ruins of ancient Roman and Phoenician history.

His last act of service was to chair the Paris fortifications commission before retiring to a private life in 1843. Count Valéé died in 1846 in Paris and was buried at Les Invalides.

Valéé's name is inscribed on the west pilar of the Arc de Triomphe.
