= Canon de 6 système An XI =

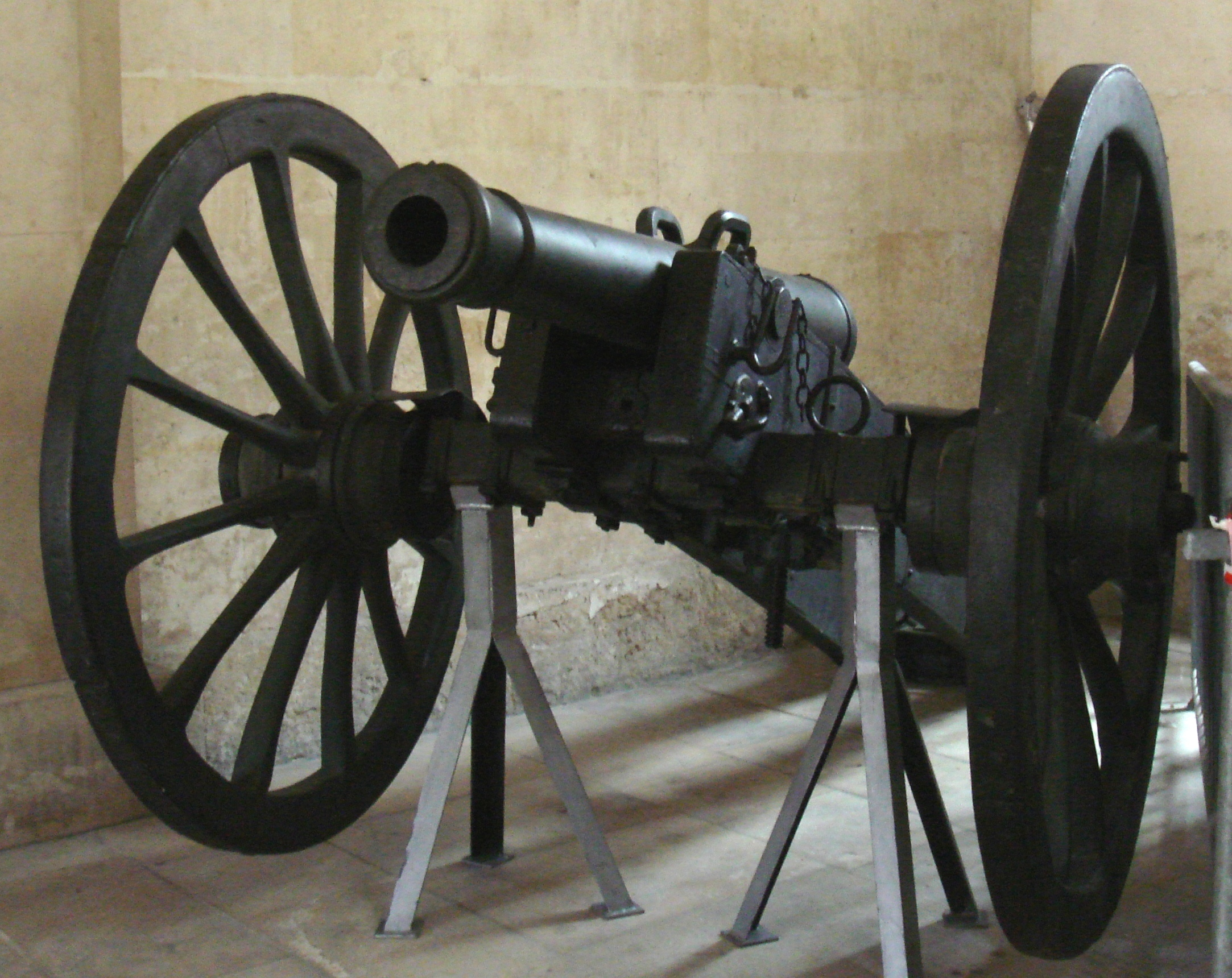
- Canon de 6 système An XI, founded in Douay in 1813, Les Invalides
- Place of origin: France

Service history
- Used by: France
- Wars: Napoleonic Wars

Production history
- Designer: Auguste de Marmont
- Designed: 1803
- Produced: 1813

Specifications
- Mass: 390 kg (860 lb)
- Barrel length: 180 cm (31 in)
- Caliber: 95.8 mm (3.77 in)
- Barrels: 1

The Canon de 6 système An XI was a French 6-pounder smoothbore cannon and part of the Year XI system of artillery. It was part of the field artillery, and complemented the Gribeauval system.

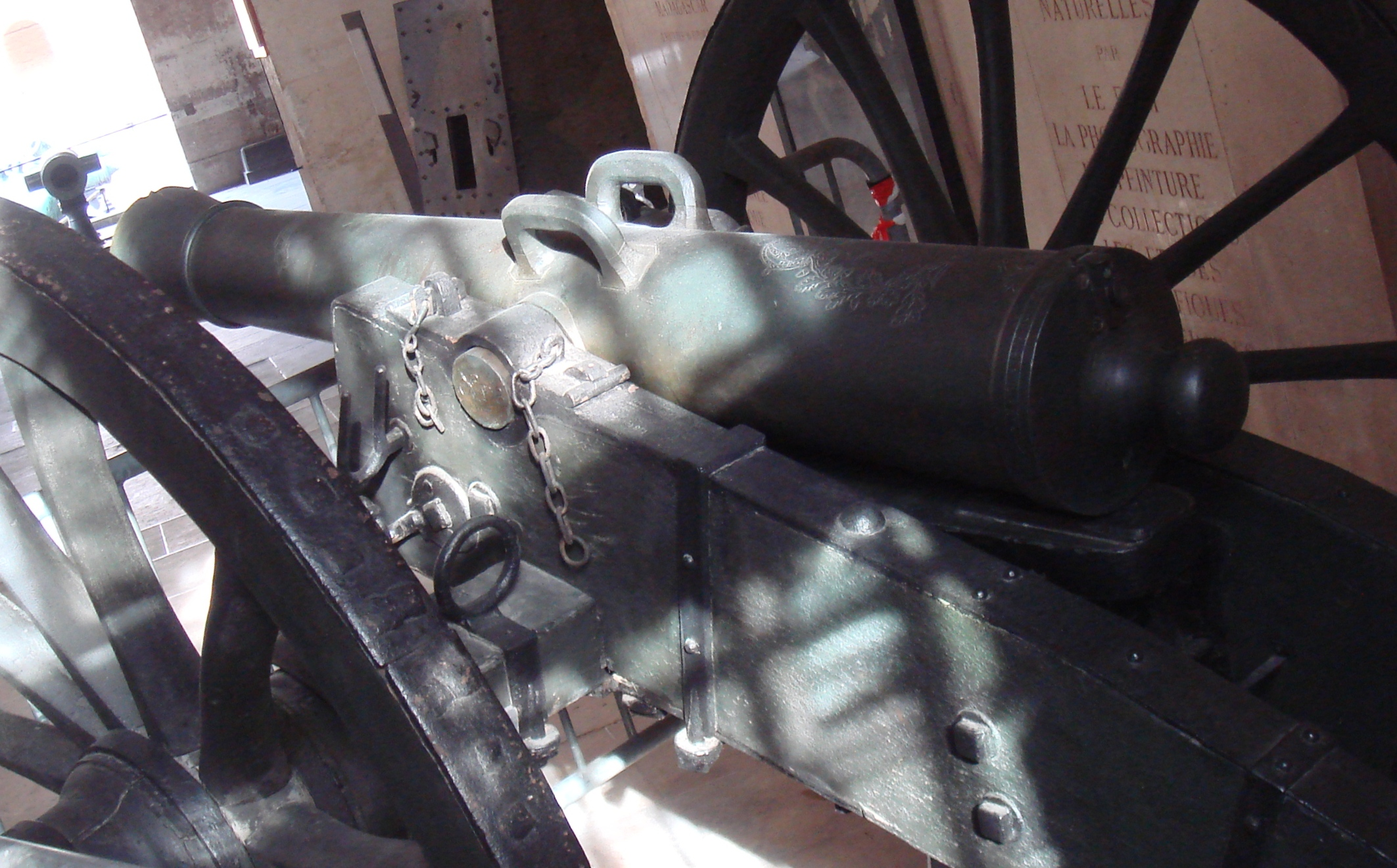
Canon de 6 système An XI, detail.

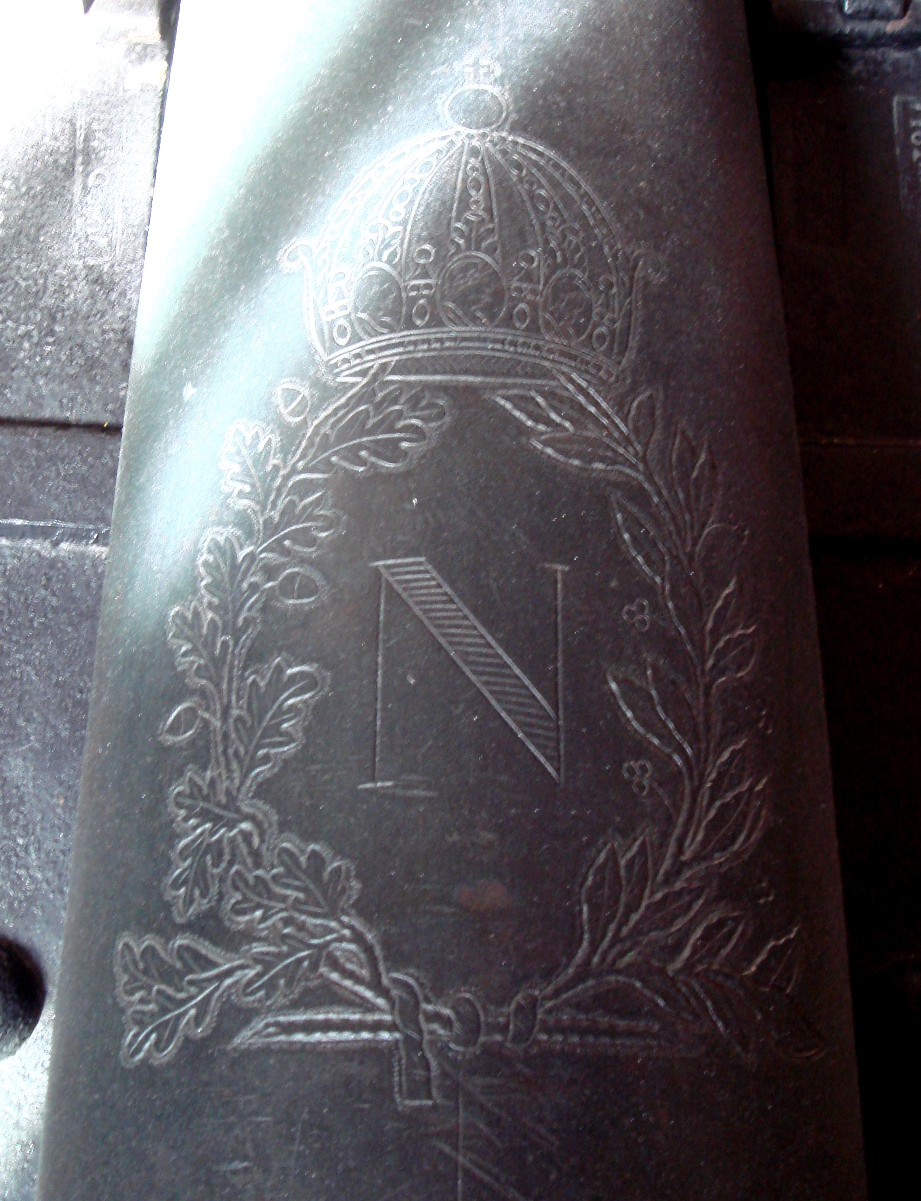
Emblem of Napoleon I on an 1813 Canon de 6 système An XI .

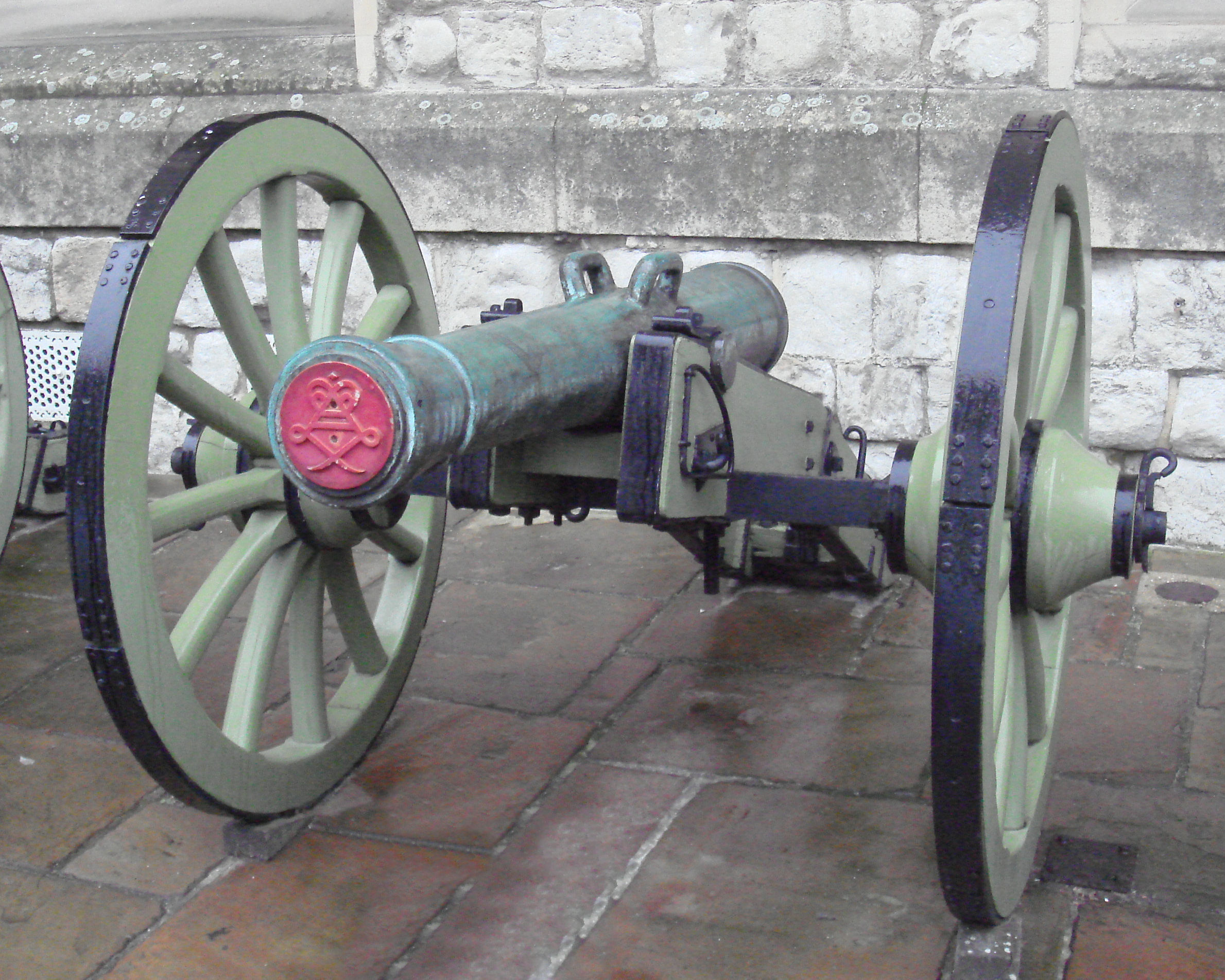
French 6-pounder field gun, cast in 1813 in Metz, captured at the Battle of Waterloo by the Duke of Wellington, now at the Tower of London.

The canon de 6 système An XI was used extensively during the Napoleonic Wars. It was considered as a good intermediate between the Canon de 8 Gribeauval, considered to be too heavy for field artillery, and the Canon de 4 Gribeauval, considered as too light and lacking striking power.

One of the characteristics of the Canon de 6 is that its design is even simpler than that of the Gribeauval cannons, as it lacks reinforcing mould rings, except for the one before the muzzle.
