= Valée system =

19th C French artillery system

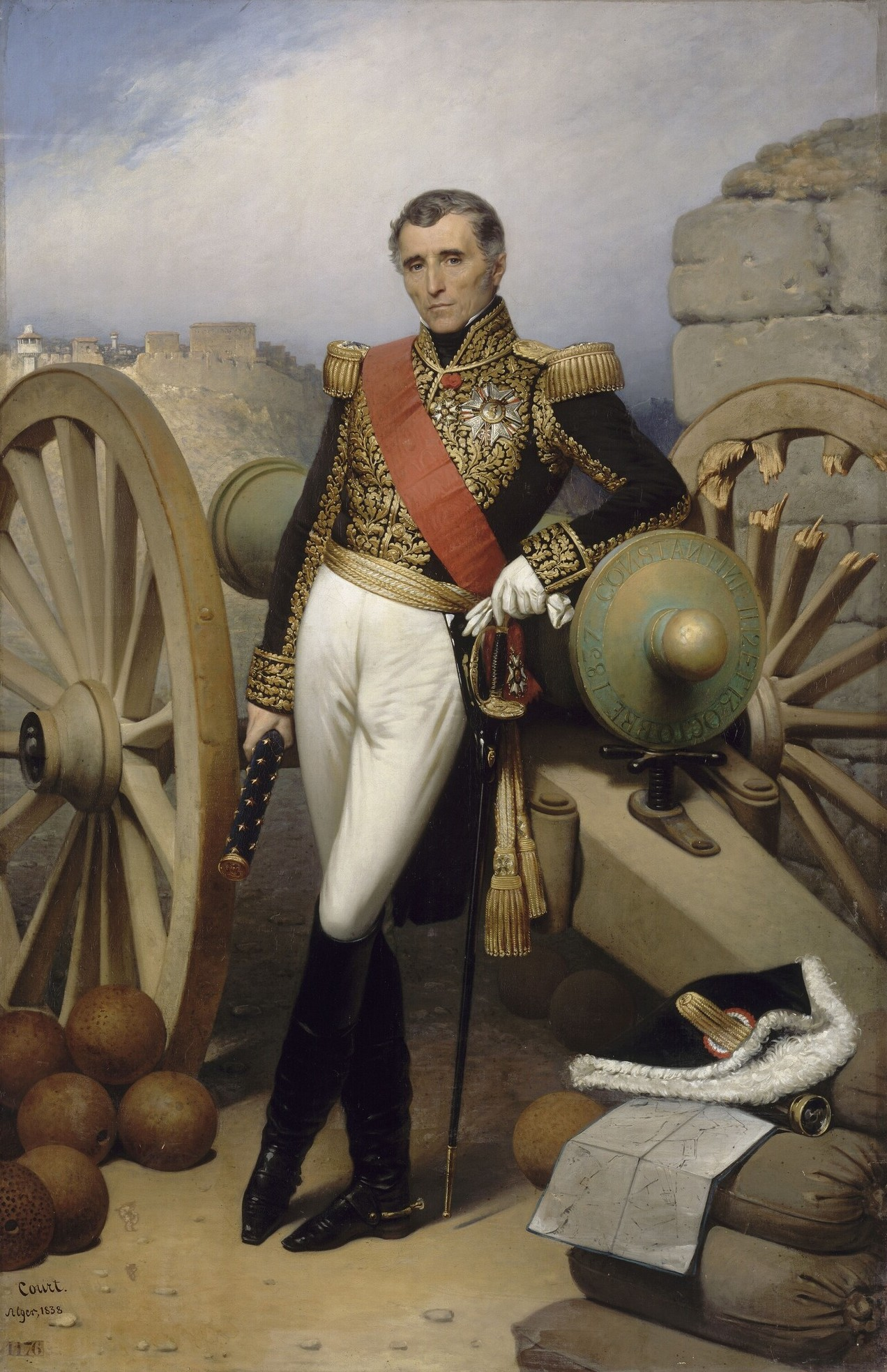
The "Gribeauval system" was improved by Sylvain-Charles, comte Valée from 1821 to 1831, to be used under the name "Valée system" until the Crimea War (1853–1856).

The Valée system (French:"Système Valée") was an artillery system developed between 1825 and 1831 by the French artillery officer Sylvain Charles Valée, and officially adopted by the French Army from 1828.

== Specifications ==
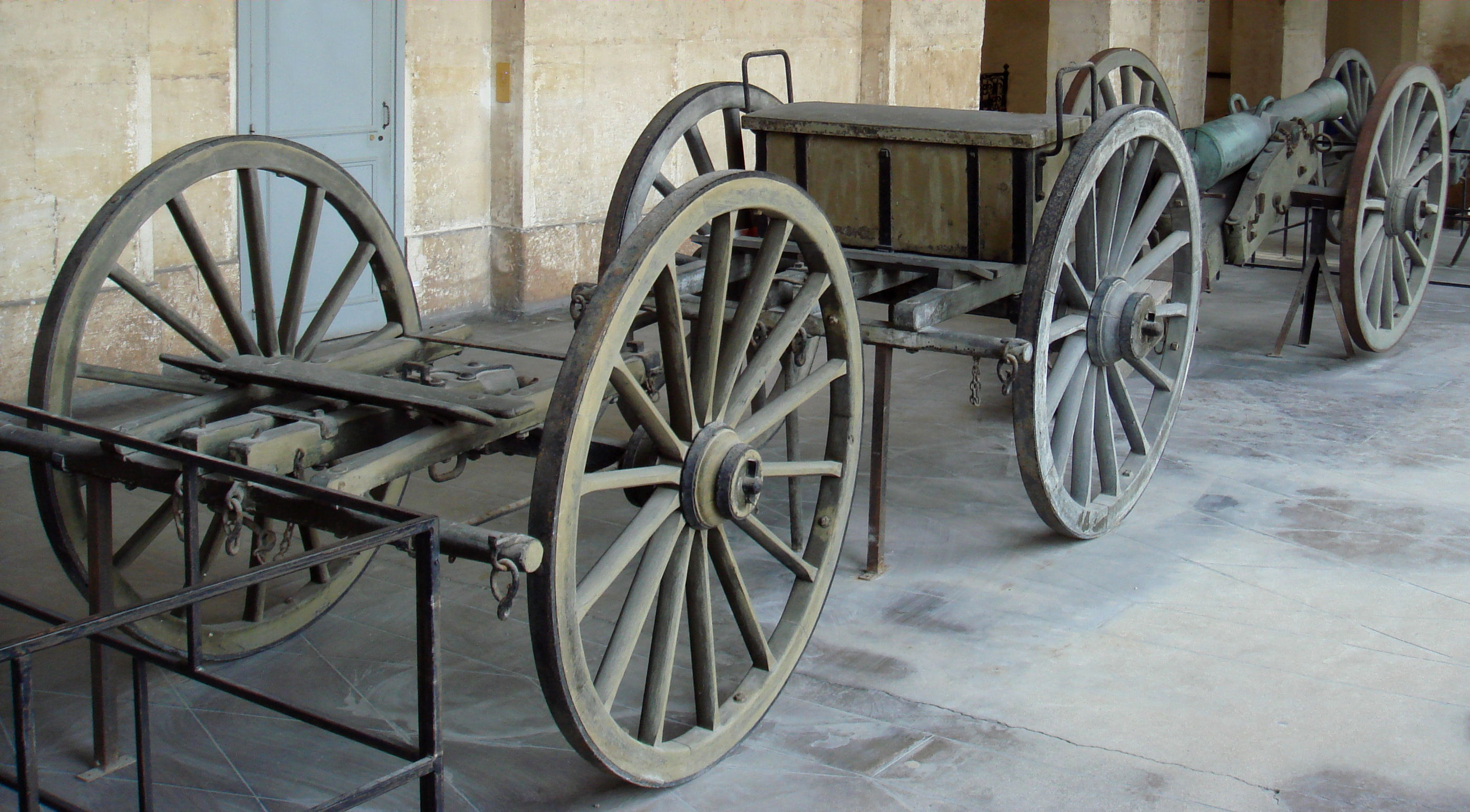
Valée artillery train for a canon de 12.

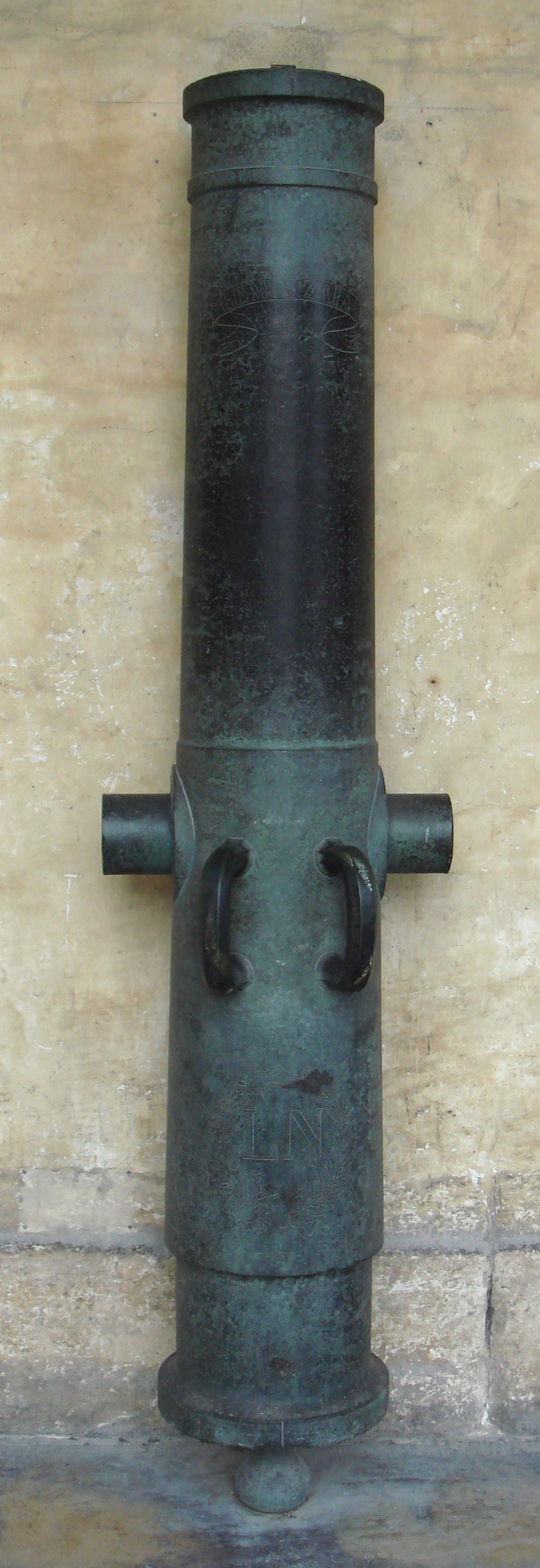
Obusier de 15 cm Valée, modèle 1828, founded in 1852 in Douai. Caliber: 151 mm. Length: 1.71 m. Weight: 587 kg. Ammunition: shell within sabot, 7.7 kg.

The Valée system consisted in various technical improvements to the Gribeauval system and Napoleon I's Year XI system. The system mainly improved the mobility of the artillery train, and simplified maintenance by standardizing limber usage and wheel size, and reducing the number of carriage types to two. It also allowed for cannoniers to be able to sit on the ammunition chests of the battery itself during transportation, allowing the whole artillery train to move as fast as the infantry or cavalry.

Valée also improved the guns themselves slightly, by making them lighter, and with a longer range.

The complete Valée system consisted in siege guns of 24 and 16 pounds (French pounds), and field guns of 12 and 8 pounds. It also included field howitzers of 24 pounds and 6 inches (Obusier de 15 cm), and a siege howitzer of 8 inches. Mountain artillery pieces were of 12 pound caliber. Mortars were of 12, 10 and 8 inches, with a 15 inches stone mortar.

== Deployment ==
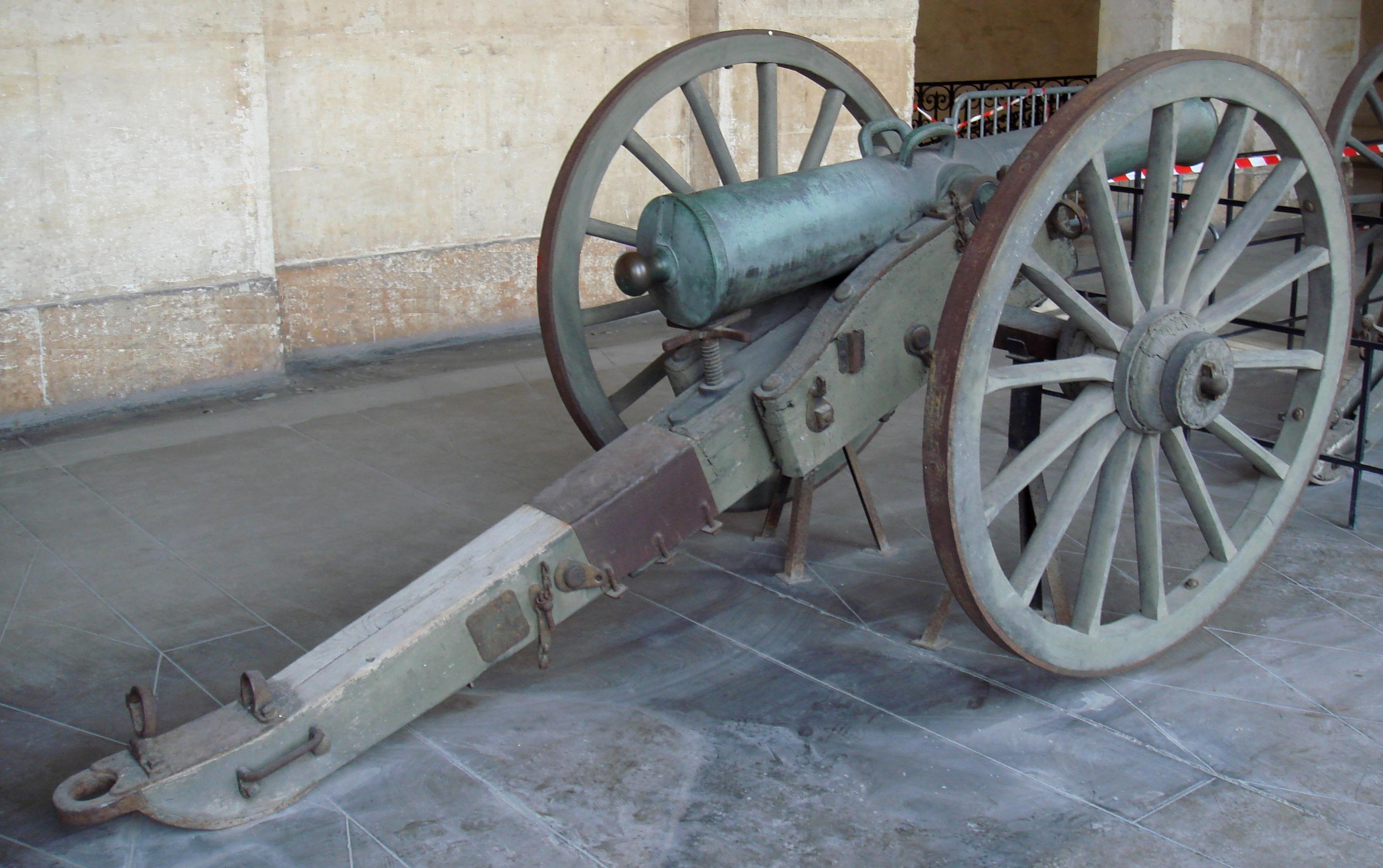
Canon de 12 Valée with carriage, 1854.

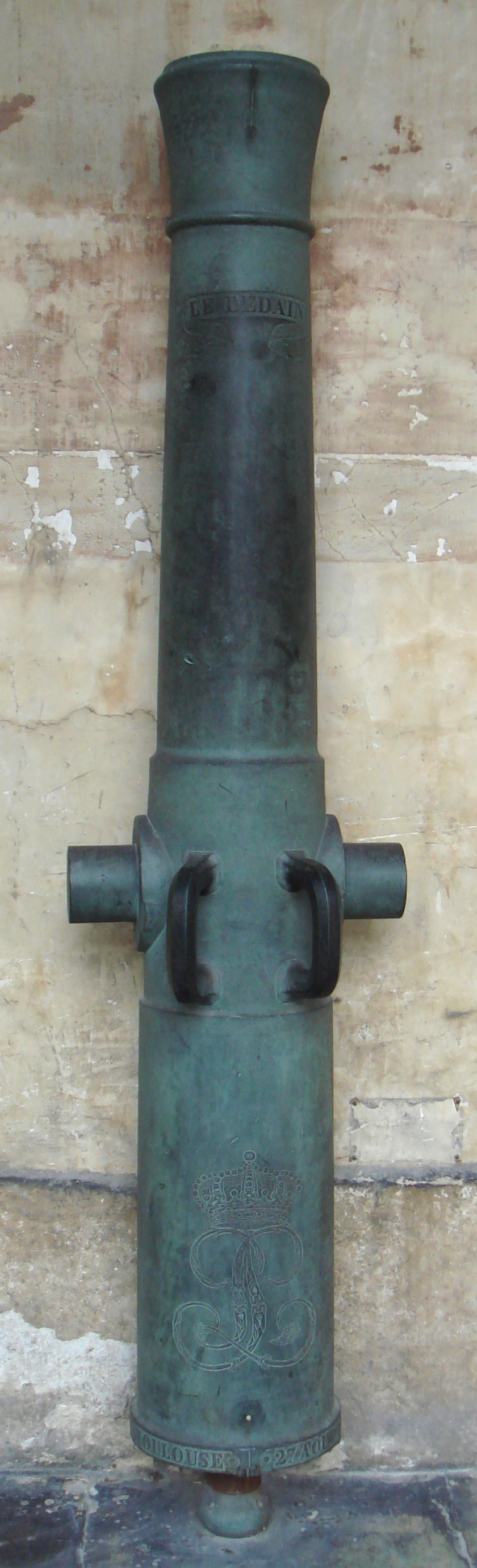
Canon de 8 Valée Le Dédain, modèle 1764 modifié 1828, founded in Strasbourg in 1847. Caliber: 106 mm. Length: 1.84 m. Weight: 590 kg. Ammunition: 5.3 kg ball with cartridge.

French artillery would be reorganized along the Valée system in 1827. It would be used at the Capture of Alger (1830) and the Fall of Constantine (1837), as well as during the Crimea War (1853–1856).

An American version of the Valee system was also developed. Some pieces are visible at the Concord Battery, Concord, Massachusetts.

A new generation of weapons would emerge in shell-firing canon obusiers, with the invention of the naval shell-gun by Paixhans in 1823, and the introduction of the canon obusier de 12 in 1853 by the French Army, which would render the Valée system obsolete.

== See also ==
Media related to Valée system at Wikimedia Commons

== Notes ==
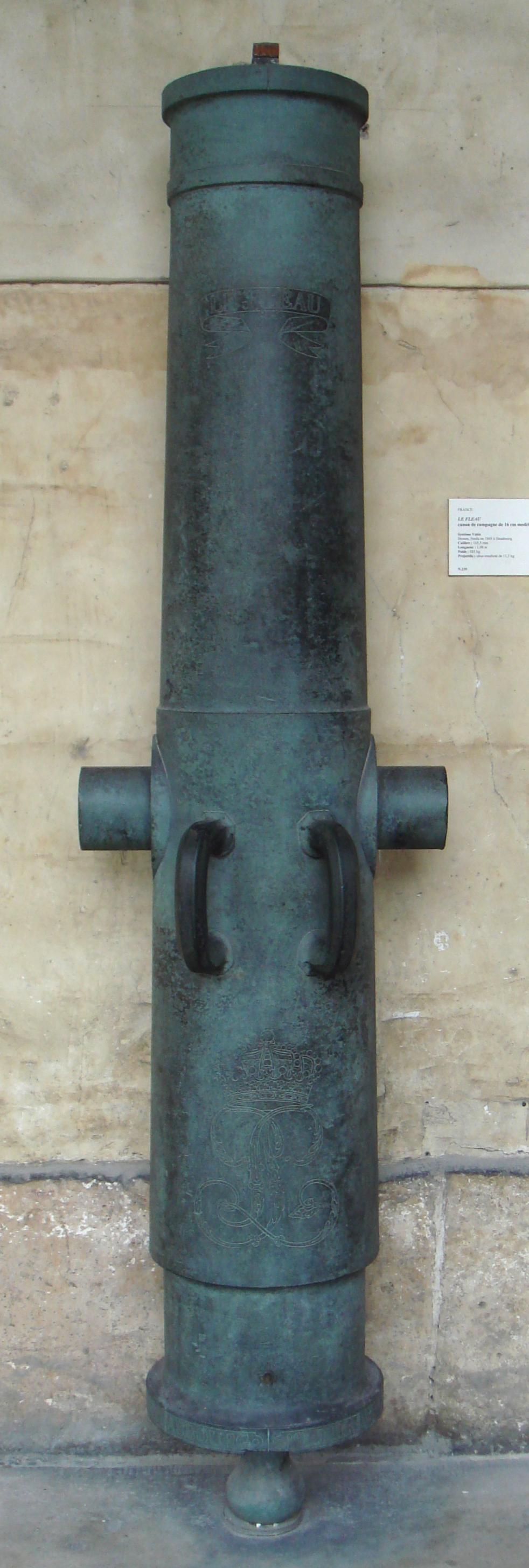
Canon de campagne de 16 cm Valée, Le Fléau, field artillery, modèle 1828, bronze, founded in Strasbourg in 1845. Caliber: 165.5 mm. Length: 1.88 m. Weight: 885 kg. Ammunition: 11.3 kg shell with sabot.

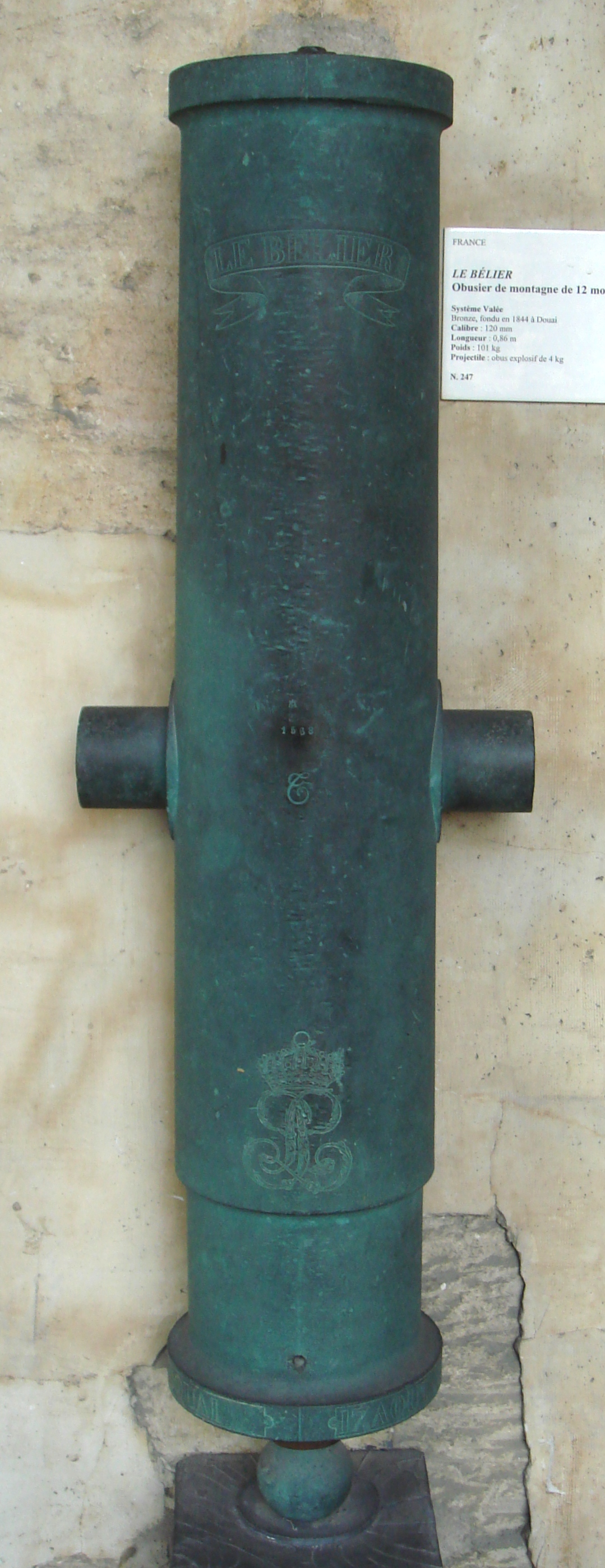
Obusier de 12 cm Valée, Le Bélier, mountain artillery, modèle 1828, bronze, founded in Douai in 1844. Caliber: 120 mm. Length: 0.86 m. Weight: 101 kg. Ammunition: 4 kg shell.
