= Year XI system =

French artillery system

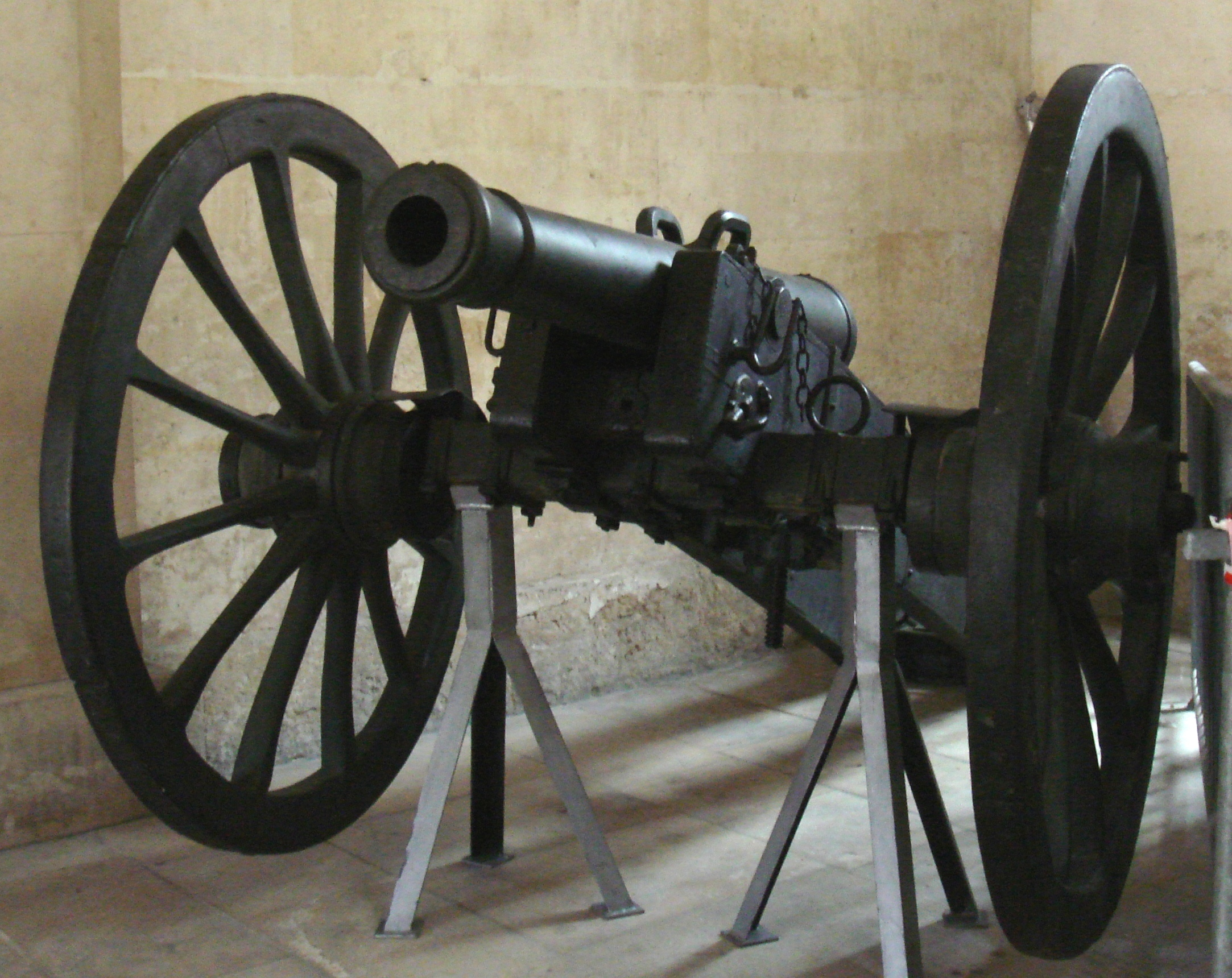
Canon de 6 système An XI, founded in Douay in 1813.

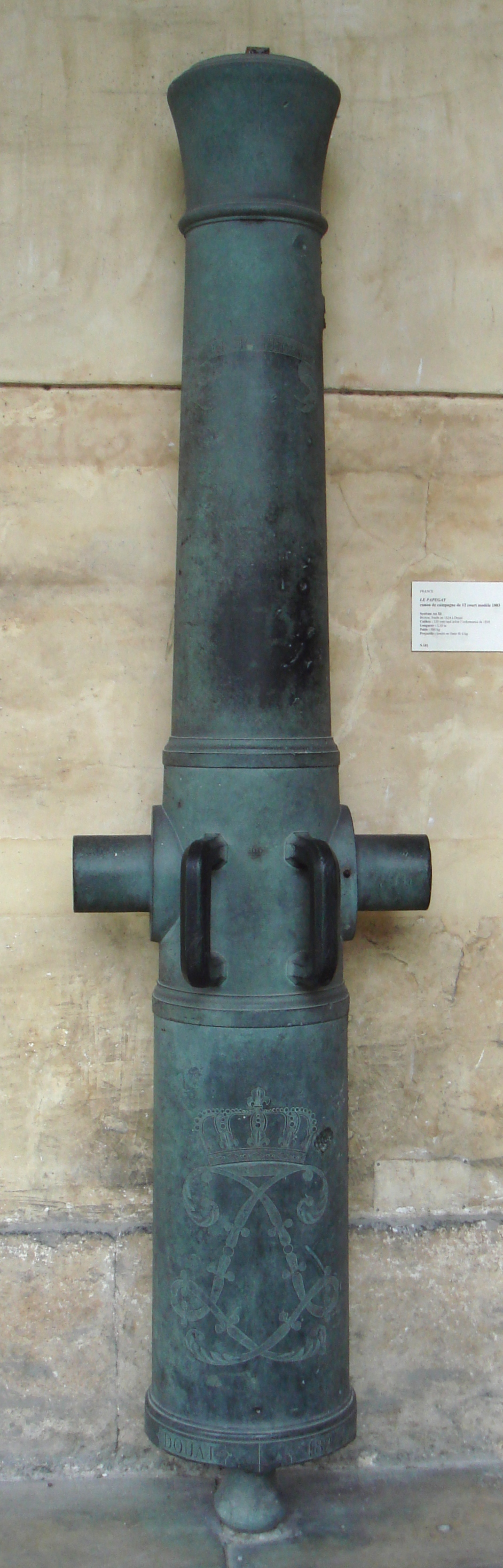
Canon de 12 court, modèle 1803 (short 12-pdr cannon, Mk 1803), Le Papegay, Year XI system. Founded in 1824 in Douai. Caliber: 120 mm (rifled in 1858). Length: 210 cm. Weight: 880 kg. Ammunition: 6 kg metal ball.

The Year XI system (French:"Système An XI", after of the 11th year of the French Republic, i.e. 1803) was a French artillery system developed during the rule of Napoleon. The Year XI system was original in that it brought various improvements to the highly successful Gribeauval system, on which many successes of the Napoleonic Wars relied. It especially consisted in streamlining the existing Gribeauval designs. The main proponent of the new system was General Marmont. It was superseded by the Valée system.

== Definition ==
In light of the French Revolutionary Wars it appeared especially that the Gribeauval 4-pdr was too light, and that the 8-pdr was too heavy for medium field artillery. These two guns had not appeared adequate against enemy 6-pdr guns.

In order to define the new improved system, Napoleon formed a committee of Artillery on 29 December 1801, presided by general Augustin Gabriel d'Aboville, First Inspector of Artillery. The committee accomplished its research from 11 January 1802 to 21 July 1802. Napoleon himself participated in the proceedings:

"The artillery should have but 4 calibres, the 6, 12, 24 prs. and the 5½-in. howitzer. In this way we abolish 4 calibres. We should add 3 prs. for mountain equipment. In abolishing the [1-pdr] Rostaing guns, we get rid of stubborn beasts not worth the trouble they give. 3 prs. should be a minimum caliber."

— Napoleon, on Gribeauval system.

The committee gave its results on 2 May 1803.

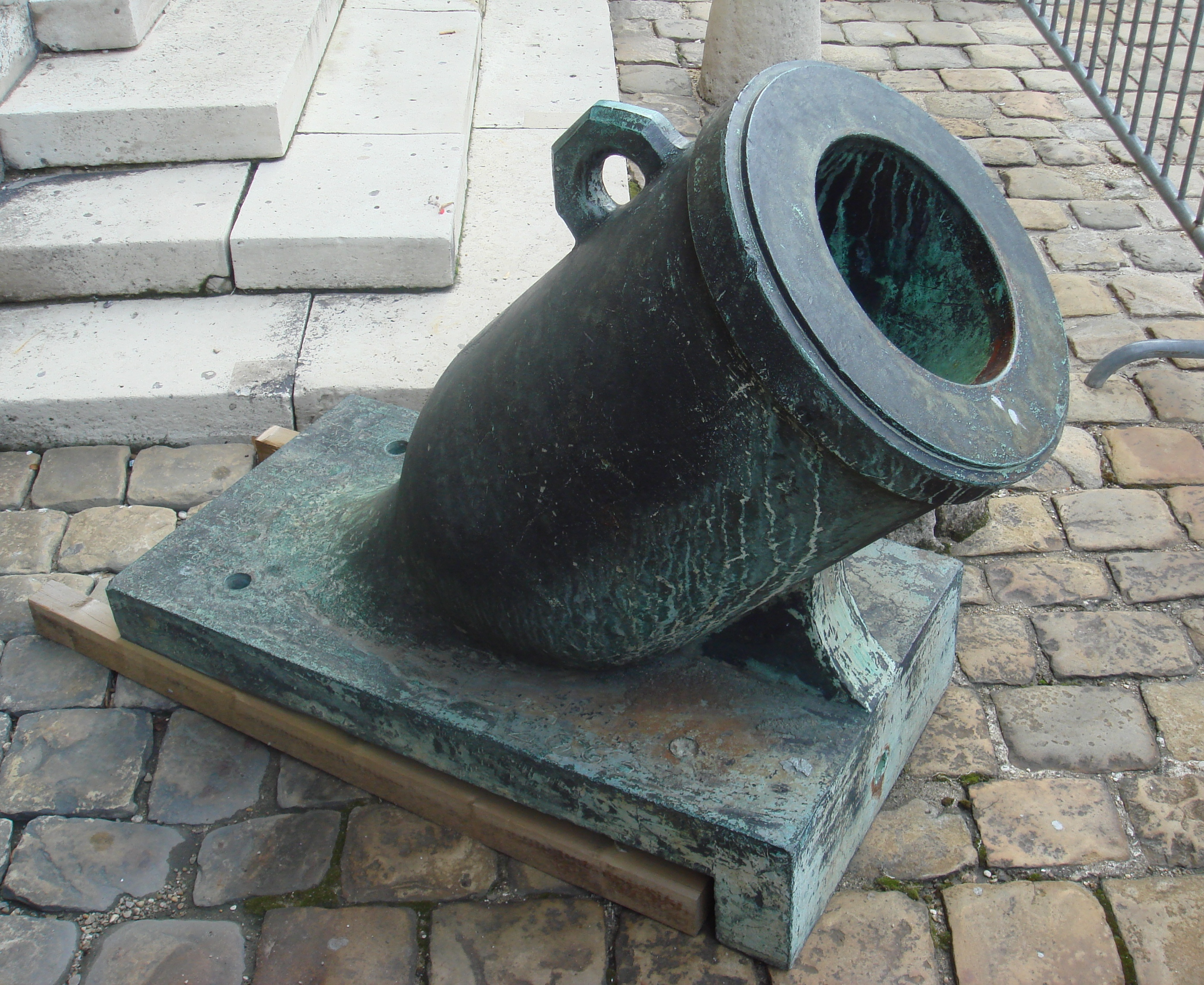
Mortar of 324 mm. Strasbourg, 1811.

One of the main findings of the committee was as follows:

- To recommend the introduction of a 6-pdr and the suppression of the 4-pdr and the 8-pdr.
- The field artillery would thus be composed of a 12-pdr cannon, a 6-pdr cannon and a 24-pdr (5.72-inch) howitzer.
- The mountain artillery would have the short 3-pdr cannon, short 6-pdr cannon and 24-pdr howitzer.
- Siege artillery was also modified, with the introduction of new Long 24-pdr and Short 24-pdr.
- Garrison artillery was also modified, with the introduction of new Long 24-pdr, Long 12-pdr and Long 6-pdr cannons.
- New Mortars as well as 324mm, 216mm and 152mm mortars, and 405mm perriers.

== Obsolescence ==
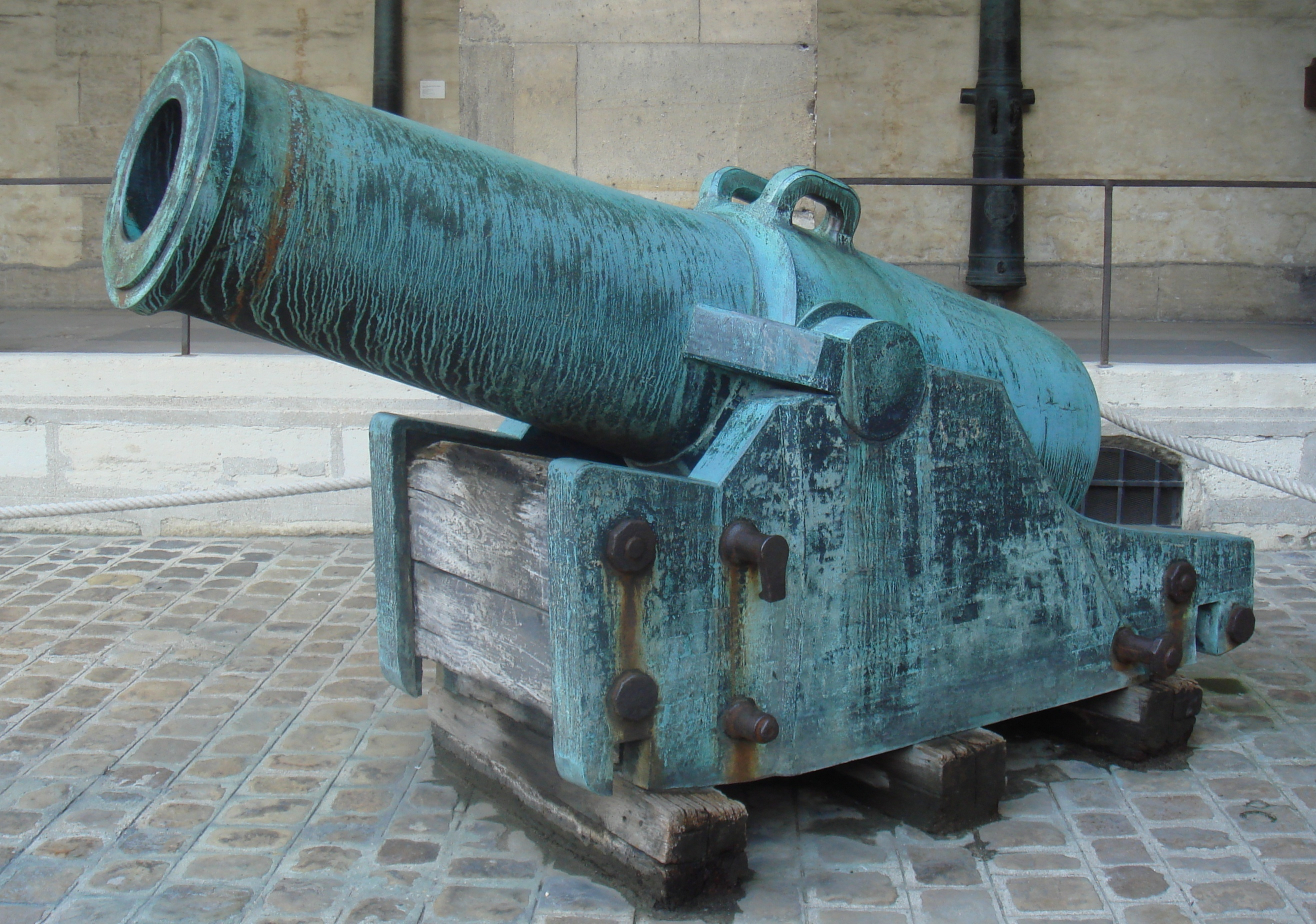
Canon obusier de 11 pouces (11-inch gun-howitzer), système An XI, bronze founded in 1810 at Douai. Caliber: 297 mm. Length: 2.56 m. Weight: 6,174 kg. Ammunition: shells.

The Year XI system would be further improved with the Valée system in 1828.

== See also ==
Media related to Year XI system at Wikimedia Commons
