= Battle of Tourcoing order of battle =

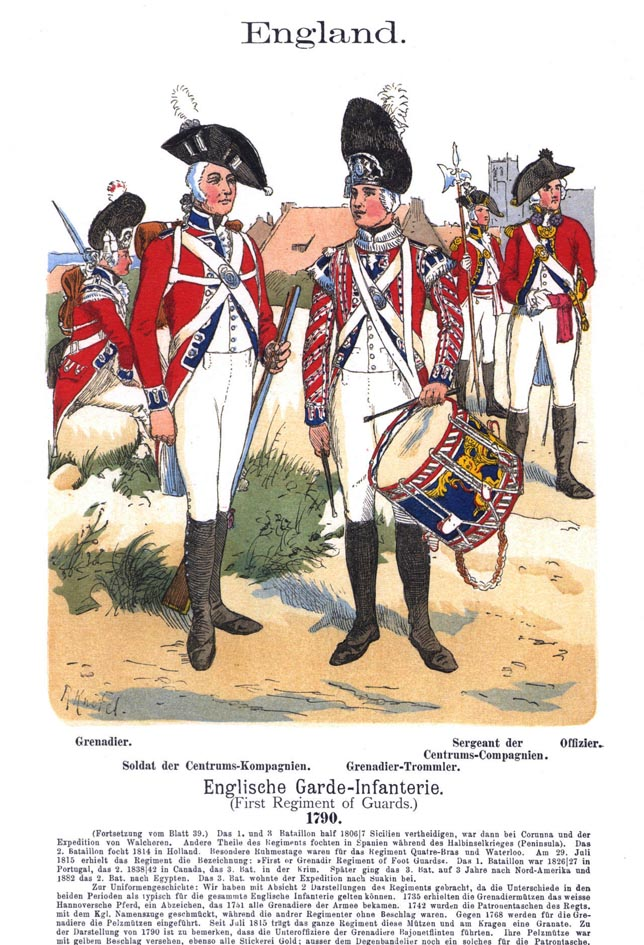
English Guard infantry made up part of Coalition Column Nr. 3.

This is the order of battle for the Battle of Tourcoing which was fought on 17–18 May 1794 between the French First Republic and the First Coalition.

== Command arrangements ==
=== French Army ===
General of Division Jean-Charles Pichegru commanded the French Army of the North. In March 1794, the Army of the North counted 194,930 soldiers, of which 126,035 men were available for the field. In addition, Pichegru had authority over the subordinate Army of the Ardennes which numbered 32,773 men. The combined total of both armies was 227,703 troops. However, Pichegru was absent during the Battle of Tourcoing, visiting the Army of the North's right wing. Therefore, General of Division Joseph Souham temporarily assumed command and exercised it capably during the battle.

In the French order of battle, numbered demi-brigades consisted of 1 regular and 2 volunteer battalions. Non-numbered demi-brigades had 3 to 6 battalions. The French army at Tourcoing numbered roughly 78,000 infantry, 5,300 cavalry, and 28 large-caliber guns. Battalion guns and their crews are not counted. Historian John Fortescue credited Souham's division with 28,000 men, Jean Moreau's division with 22,000 troops, Jacques Bonnaud's division with 20,000 soldiers, and Pierre-Jacques Osten's division with 10,000 men. (Note: Fortescue's numbers may not match the figures listed in the French order of battle. Also, Fortescue called Osten a division commander (Fortescue, p. 111), while Brown's order of battle listed Osten as Bonnaud's subordinate (Brown, p. 306).)

=== Coalition Army ===
Francis II, Holy Roman Emperor arrived at Imperial headquarters on 14 April 1794 and was the supreme commander of the Coalition forces. Prince Josias of Coburg carried out the function of army commander and Karl Mack von Leiberich acted as chief of staff to the emperor. The Coalition army at Tourcoing numbered about 62,100 infantry, 11,700 cavalry, and 28 large-caliber guns. An unknown number of battalion guns were attached to the units.

== Abbreviations ==
=== Ranks ===
- FZM = Feldzeugmeister (Gen)
- FML = Feldmarschall-Leutnant (LG)
- GM = General Major
- Gen = Full General
- LG = Lieutenant General
- MG = Major General
- GD = General of Division
- GB = General of Brigade
- CdB = Chef de brigade (Colonel)

=== Other ===
- Nr. = Regiment number for Austrian, Dutch, Hanoverian, and Hessian regiments
- 4pdr = 4-pounder gun
- 6pdr = 6-pounder gun
- 8pdr = 8-pounder gun
- 12pdr = 12-pounder gun

== French order of battle ==
Army of the North: GD Jean-Charles Pichegru (absent) vice GD Joseph Souham

French Army of the North
Division	Brigade (Note: In his order of battle, Brown listed Jardon, Macdonald, Malbrancq, Daendels, Vandamme, Desenfans, Osten, Pierquin, Compère, and Thierry as divisions subordinate to the divisions of Souham, Moreau, and Bonnaud (Brown, pp. 303–307). However, he and Phipps also listed Macdonald, Malbrancq, Daendels, Vandamme, Desenfans, Compère, and Thierry as brigades (Brown, p. 172; Phipps, pp. 300–302). Therefore, they are listed in this order of battle as brigades. Groupings of battalions are listed as demi-brigades.)	Demi-Brigades and Others	Strength
Division Souham; GD Herman Willem Daendels	Advance Guard; CdB Rubry	2nd Foot Chasseurs Regiment	456 infantry
Division Souham; GD Herman Willem Daendels	Advance Guard; CdB Rubry	1st Tirailleurs Battalion	1,034 infantry
Division Souham; GD Herman Willem Daendels	Advance Guard; CdB Rubry	5th Horse Chasseurs Regiment	273 cavalry
Division Souham; GD Herman Willem Daendels	Brigade Jardon; GB Henri-Antoine Jardon	Advance Guard (CdB Simon)	2,243 infantry (3 battalions)
Division Souham; GD Herman Willem Daendels	Brigade Jardon; GB Henri-Antoine Jardon	29th Line Demi-Brigade	2,559 infantry (3 battalions)
Division Souham; GD Herman Willem Daendels	Brigade Jardon; GB Henri-Antoine Jardon	199th Line Demi-Brigade	2,618 infantry (3 battalions)
Division Souham; GD Herman Willem Daendels	Brigade Jardon; GB Henri-Antoine Jardon	20th Cavalry Regiment	336 cavalry
Division Souham; GD Herman Willem Daendels	Brigade Macdonald; GB Étienne Macdonald	Advance Guard (Major d'Argent)	757 infantry (1 battalion), 167 cavalry
Division Souham; GD Herman Willem Daendels	Brigade Macdonald; GB Étienne Macdonald	3rd Line Demi-Brigade	2,808 infantry (3 battalions)
Division Souham; GD Herman Willem Daendels	Brigade Macdonald; GB Étienne Macdonald	24th Line Demi-Brigade	2,346 infantry (3 battalions)
Division Souham; GD Herman Willem Daendels	Brigade Macdonald; GB Étienne Macdonald	68th Line Demi-Brigade	2,594 infantry (3 battalions)
Division Souham; GD Herman Willem Daendels	Brigade Macdonald; GB Étienne Macdonald	200th Line Demi-Brigade	2,764 infantry (3 battalions)
Division Souham; GD Herman Willem Daendels	Brigade Macdonald; GB Étienne Macdonald	2nd Carabinier Regiment	? cavalry
Division Souham; GD Herman Willem Daendels	Brigade Macdonald; GB Étienne Macdonald	11th Horse Artillery	6 × 4-pdr
Division Souham; GD Herman Willem Daendels	Brigade Malbrancq; GB Philippe Malbrancq	Advanced Guard (CdB Druot)	2,778 infantry (3 battalions), 31 cavalry, 6 × 4-pdr
Division Souham; GD Herman Willem Daendels	Brigade Malbrancq; GB Philippe Malbrancq	150th Line Demi-Brigade	2,735 infantry (3 battalions)
Division Souham; GD Herman Willem Daendels	Brigade Malbrancq; GB Philippe Malbrancq	19th Cavalry Regiment (Note: A careful examination of the order of battle suggests that this may be a typographical error for the 19th Horse Chasseurs. The 19th Cavalry was assigned to Daendels' brigade (Brown, p. 304).)	244 cavalry
Division Souham; GD Herman Willem Daendels	Brigade Daendels; CdB Dehay	Advanced Guard (CdB Dereix)	1,476 infantry (3 battalions)
Division Souham; GD Herman Willem Daendels	Brigade Daendels; CdB Dehay	23rd Line Demi-Brigade	2,202 infantry (3 battalions)
Division Souham; GD Herman Willem Daendels	Brigade Daendels; CdB Dehay	27th Line Demi-Brigade	2,712 infantry (3 battalions)
Division Souham; GD Herman Willem Daendels	Brigade Daendels; CdB Dehay	9th Hussar Regiment; 19th Cavalry Regiment	499 cavalry
Division Souham; GD Herman Willem Daendels	Artillery	Foot Artillery	6 × 12-pdr, 6 × 8-pdr, 405 infantry (1 battalion)
Division Souham; GD Herman Willem Daendels	Artillery	Horse Artillery	4 × 8-pdr
Division Moreau; GD Jean Victor Marie Moreau	Brigade Vandamme; GB Dominique Vandamme	Advanced Guard (CdB Toussant)	916 infantry (1 battalion), 168 cavalry
Division Moreau; GD Jean Victor Marie Moreau	Brigade Vandamme; GB Dominique Vandamme	Demi-Brigade Harcourt	3,161 infantry (4 battalions), 52 cavalry
Division Moreau; GD Jean Victor Marie Moreau	Brigade Vandamme; GB Dominique Vandamme	Demi-Brigade Gauthrin	3,707 infantry (5 battalions)
Division Moreau; GD Jean Victor Marie Moreau	Brigade Desenfans; GB Nicolas Desenfans	Advanced Guard (CdB Ducroix)	2,263 infantry (3 battalions)
Division Moreau; GD Jean Victor Marie Moreau	Brigade Desenfans; GB Nicolas Desenfans	Demi-Brigade Trousseau	2,767 infantry (4 battalions)
Division Moreau; GD Jean Victor Marie Moreau	Brigade Desenfans; GB Nicolas Desenfans	Demi-Brigade Bouvoir	3,149 infantry (4 battalions)
Division Moreau; GD Jean Victor Marie Moreau	Cavalry	21st Horse Chasseur Regiment (Note: Elements of the 21st Horse Chasseurs Regiment were also detached to Vandamme's Advanced Guard and Demi-Brigade Harcourt (Brown, pp. 305–306).)	204 cavalry
Division Moreau; GD Jean Victor Marie Moreau	Artillery	Foot Artillery	6 × 8-pdr, 6 × 6-pdr
Division Moreau; GD Jean Victor Marie Moreau	Artillery	Horse Artillery	4 × 6-pdr
Division Bonnaud; GD Jacques Philippe Bonnaud	Brigade Osten; GB Pierre-Jacques Osten	Advanced Guard (CdB Beaufont)	2,723 infantry (3 battalions)
Division Bonnaud; GD Jacques Philippe Bonnaud	Brigade Osten; GB Pierre-Jacques Osten	Demi-Brigade Girard	2,907 infantry (3 battalions)
Division Bonnaud; GD Jacques Philippe Bonnaud	Brigade Osten; GB Pierre-Jacques Osten	Demi-Brigade Brenier	1,848 infantry (3 battalions)
Division Bonnaud; GD Jacques Philippe Bonnaud	Brigade Pierquin; GB Nicolas Pierquin	Demi-Brigade Salme	4,299 infantry (6 battalions)
Division Bonnaud; GD Jacques Philippe Bonnaud	Brigade Pierquin; GB Nicolas Pierquin	Demi-Brigade Leclerc	2,202 infantry (3 battalions)
Division Bonnaud; GD Jacques Philippe Bonnaud	Brigade Pierquin; GB Nicolas Pierquin	Demi-Brigade Noël	4,578 infantry (6 battalions)
Division Bonnaud; GD Jacques Philippe Bonnaud	Cavalry; GB Antoine Baillot-Faral	Brigade Scholtenius	993 cavalry (3 hussar regiments)
Division Bonnaud; GD Jacques Philippe Bonnaud	Cavalry; GB Antoine Baillot-Faral	Brigade Bouquet	1,015 cavalry (2 chasseur & 1 dragoon regiments)
Division Bonnaud; GD Jacques Philippe Bonnaud	Cavalry; GB Antoine Baillot-Faral	Brigade Jaucourt-Latour	1,396 cavalry (3 1/2 heavy regiments)
Division Bonnaud; GD Jacques Philippe Bonnaud	Brigade Compère; GB Louis Fursy Henri Compère	Demi-Brigade Trudeau	2,982 infantry (4 battalions)
Division Bonnaud; GD Jacques Philippe Bonnaud	Brigade Compère; GB Louis Fursy Henri Compère	Demi-Brigade Roget	2,402 infantry (3 battalions)
Division Bonnaud; GD Jacques Philippe Bonnaud	Brigade Compère; GB Louis Fursy Henri Compère	Artillery	306 gunners
Division Bonnaud; GD Jacques Philippe Bonnaud	Brigade Thierry; GB Jean François Thierry	Demi-Brigade Flavier	2,921 infantry (3 battalions)
Division Bonnaud; GD Jacques Philippe Bonnaud	Brigade Thierry; GB Jean François Thierry	Demi-Brigade Beauvoir	2,881 infantry (3 battalions)
Division Bonnaud; GD Jacques Philippe Bonnaud	Brigade Thierry; GB Jean François Thierry	1st Cavalry Regiment	475 cavalry
Division Bonnaud; GD Jacques Philippe Bonnaud	Brigade Thierry; GB Jean François Thierry	Foot Artillery	127 gunners, 9 × 4-pdr
Artillery Park; GB Jean Baptiste Eblé	Unbrigaded	Personnel	2,218 gunners
Artillery Park; GB Jean Baptiste Eblé	Unbrigaded	Foot Artillery	6 × 12-pdr, 6 × 8-pdr, 6 × 4-pdr
Artillery Park; GB Jean Baptiste Eblé	Unbrigaded	Horse Artillery	4 × 8-pdr

== Coalition order of battle ==
- Supreme Commander: Francis II, Holy Roman Emperor
- Coalition Army: FZM Prince Josias of Coburg

Coalition Army
Column	Brigade/Nationality (Note: Units not identified as British, Dutch, French royalist, Hanover, Hesse-Cassel or Hesse-Darmstadt nationality are Austrian.)	Regiments and Others
Northern Column; FZM François, Count of Clerfayt; 16,601 infantry, 3,451 cavalry	Advance Guard; GM Rudolph von Hammerstein	Hanover Grenadier Battalion Nr. 3
Northern Column; FZM François, Count of Clerfayt; 16,601 infantry, 3,451 cavalry	Advance Guard; GM Rudolph von Hammerstein	Hanover Light Infantry Regiment Diepenbroick Nr. 14 (1 battalion)
Northern Column; FZM François, Count of Clerfayt; 16,601 infantry, 3,451 cavalry	Advance Guard; GM Rudolph von Hammerstein	British 55th Foot Regiment
Northern Column; FZM François, Count of Clerfayt; 16,601 infantry, 3,451 cavalry	Advance Guard; GM Rudolph von Hammerstein	French Royalist Loyal Emigrants
Northern Column; FZM François, Count of Clerfayt; 16,601 infantry, 3,451 cavalry	Advance Guard; GM Rudolph von Hammerstein	Hanover Leibgarde Cavalry Regiment (2 squadrons)
Northern Column; FZM François, Count of Clerfayt; 16,601 infantry, 3,451 cavalry	Advance Guard; GM Rudolph von Hammerstein	Hanover Light Dragoon Regiment Königin Nr. 9 (2 squadrons)
Northern Column; FZM François, Count of Clerfayt; 16,601 infantry, 3,451 cavalry	Advance Guard; GM Rudolph von Hammerstein	Hanover Light Dragoon Regiment Linsingen Nr. 10 (2 squadrons)
Northern Column; FZM François, Count of Clerfayt; 16,601 infantry, 3,451 cavalry	Advance Guard; GM Rudolph von Hammerstein	Hesse-Darmstadt Gensd'armes Regiment (2 squadrons)
Northern Column; FZM François, Count of Clerfayt; 16,601 infantry, 3,451 cavalry	Austrian; FZM Prince Hohenlohe-Kirchberg; FML Anton Sztáray; GM Rudolf von Stein	Grün-Laudon Freikorps (6 companies)
Northern Column; FZM François, Count of Clerfayt; 16,601 infantry, 3,451 cavalry	Austrian; FZM Prince Hohenlohe-Kirchberg; FML Anton Sztáray; GM Rudolf von Stein	Tyrolean Sharpshooters (2 companies)
Northern Column; FZM François, Count of Clerfayt; 16,601 infantry, 3,451 cavalry	Austrian; FZM Prince Hohenlohe-Kirchberg; FML Anton Sztáray; GM Rudolf von Stein	Feld-Jäger-Korps de Loup (2 companies)
Northern Column; FZM François, Count of Clerfayt; 16,601 infantry, 3,451 cavalry	Austrian; FZM Prince Hohenlohe-Kirchberg; FML Anton Sztáray; GM Rudolf von Stein	Line Infantry Regiment Archduke Karl Nr. 3 (2 battalions)
Northern Column; FZM François, Count of Clerfayt; 16,601 infantry, 3,451 cavalry	Austrian; FZM Prince Hohenlohe-Kirchberg; FML Anton Sztáray; GM Rudolf von Stein	Line Infantry Regiment Clerfayt Nr. 9 (2 battalions)
Northern Column; FZM François, Count of Clerfayt; 16,601 infantry, 3,451 cavalry	Austrian; FZM Prince Hohenlohe-Kirchberg; FML Anton Sztáray; GM Rudolf von Stein	Line Infantry Regiment Wilhelm Schröder Nr. 26 (2 battalions)
Northern Column; FZM François, Count of Clerfayt; 16,601 infantry, 3,451 cavalry	Austrian; FZM Prince Hohenlohe-Kirchberg; FML Anton Sztáray; GM Rudolf von Stein	Line Infantry Regiment Sztaray Nr. 33 (2 battalions)
Northern Column; FZM François, Count of Clerfayt; 16,601 infantry, 3,451 cavalry	Austrian; FZM Prince Hohenlohe-Kirchberg; FML Anton Sztáray; GM Rudolf von Stein	Line Infantry Regiment Württemberg Nr. 38 (2 battalions)
Northern Column; FZM François, Count of Clerfayt; 16,601 infantry, 3,451 cavalry	Austrian; FZM Prince Hohenlohe-Kirchberg; FML Anton Sztáray; GM Rudolf von Stein	Cavalry Regiment (Dragoon) Kaiser Franz Nr. 1 (6 squadrons)
Northern Column; FZM François, Count of Clerfayt; 16,601 infantry, 3,451 cavalry	Austrian; FZM Prince Hohenlohe-Kirchberg; FML Anton Sztáray; GM Rudolf von Stein	Cavalry Regiment (Hussar) Blankenstein Nr. 16 (6 squadrons)
Northern Column; FZM François, Count of Clerfayt; 16,601 infantry, 3,451 cavalry	Austrian; FZM Prince Hohenlohe-Kirchberg; FML Anton Sztáray; GM Rudolf von Stein	Cavalry Regiment (Dragoon) Latour Nr. 25 (4 squadrons)
Northern Column; FZM François, Count of Clerfayt; 16,601 infantry, 3,451 cavalry	British	British 12th Foot Regiment
Northern Column; FZM François, Count of Clerfayt; 16,601 infantry, 3,451 cavalry	British	British 8th Light Dragoon Regiment
Northern Column; FZM François, Count of Clerfayt; 16,601 infantry, 3,451 cavalry	Hanover	Hanover Light Infantry Regiment Diepenbroick Nr. 14 (1 battalion)
Northern Column; FZM François, Count of Clerfayt; 16,601 infantry, 3,451 cavalry	Hanover	Hanover Grenadier Battalion Nr. 4
Northern Column; FZM François, Count of Clerfayt; 16,601 infantry, 3,451 cavalry	Hesse-Darmstadt	Hesse-Darmstadt Jägers (1 company)
Northern Column; FZM François, Count of Clerfayt; 16,601 infantry, 3,451 cavalry	Hesse-Darmstadt	Hesse-Darmstadt Infantry Regiment Landgraf (2 battalions)
Northern Column; FZM François, Count of Clerfayt; 16,601 infantry, 3,451 cavalry	Hesse-Darmstadt	Hesse-Darmstadt Light Battalion
Northern Column; FZM François, Count of Clerfayt; 16,601 infantry, 3,451 cavalry	Hesse-Darmstadt	Hesse-Darmstadt Leib-Regiment
Northern Column; FZM François, Count of Clerfayt; 16,601 infantry, 3,451 cavalry	Hesse-Darmstadt	Hesse-Darmstadt Chevaux-legers Regiment (2 squadrons)
Column Number 1 LG Georg Wilhelm von dem Bussche; 3,000 infantry, 1,000 cavalry	Unbrigaded	Hanover Grenadier Battalion Nr. 1
Column Number 1 LG Georg Wilhelm von dem Bussche; 3,000 infantry, 1,000 cavalry	Unbrigaded	Hanover Infantry Regiment Scherther Nr. 1 (2 battalions)
Column Number 1 LG Georg Wilhelm von dem Bussche; 3,000 infantry, 1,000 cavalry	Unbrigaded	Hanover Infantry Regiment Bothmer Nr. 4 (2 battalions)
Column Number 1 LG Georg Wilhelm von dem Bussche; 3,000 infantry, 1,000 cavalry	Unbrigaded	Hanover Infantry Regiment Hammerstein Nr. 6 (2 battalions)
Column Number 1 LG Georg Wilhelm von dem Bussche; 3,000 infantry, 1,000 cavalry	Unbrigaded	Hanover Infantry Regiment Duering Nr. 9 (2 battalions)
Column Number 1 LG Georg Wilhelm von dem Bussche; 3,000 infantry, 1,000 cavalry	Unbrigaded	Hanover Infantry Regiment Taube Nr. 11 (2 battalions)
Column Number 1 LG Georg Wilhelm von dem Bussche; 3,000 infantry, 1,000 cavalry	Unbrigaded	Hanover Cavalry Regiment Leib Nr. 1 (2 squadrons)
Column Number 1 LG Georg Wilhelm von dem Bussche; 3,000 infantry, 1,000 cavalry	Unbrigaded	Hanover Cavalry Regiment Prinz August Nr. 2 (2 squadrons)
Column Number 1 LG Georg Wilhelm von dem Bussche; 3,000 infantry, 1,000 cavalry	Unbrigaded	Hanover Cavalry Regiment Bussche Nr. 4 (2 squadrons)
Column Number 1 LG Georg Wilhelm von dem Bussche; 3,000 infantry, 1,000 cavalry	Unbrigaded	Hanover Heavy Dragoon Regiment Ramdohr Nr. 5 (2 squadrons)
Column Number 1 LG Georg Wilhelm von dem Bussche; 3,000 infantry, 1,000 cavalry	Unbrigaded	Hanover Heavy Dragoon Regiment Oeynhausen Nr. 7 (2 squadrons)
Column Number 2 FML Rudolf Ritter von Otto; 8,847 infantry, 1,068 cavalry	Austrian; GM Konrad Valentin von Kaim; GM Franz von Werneck	Jägers (1 company)
Column Number 2 FML Rudolf Ritter von Otto; 8,847 infantry, 1,068 cavalry	Austrian; GM Konrad Valentin von Kaim; GM Franz von Werneck	2/O'Donnell Freikorps (6 companies)
Column Number 2 FML Rudolf Ritter von Otto; 8,847 infantry, 1,068 cavalry	Austrian; GM Konrad Valentin von Kaim; GM Franz von Werneck	Rouviere Grenadier Battalion
Column Number 2 FML Rudolf Ritter von Otto; 8,847 infantry, 1,068 cavalry	Austrian; GM Konrad Valentin von Kaim; GM Franz von Werneck	Ulm Grenadier Battalion
Column Number 2 FML Rudolf Ritter von Otto; 8,847 infantry, 1,068 cavalry	Austrian; GM Konrad Valentin von Kaim; GM Franz von Werneck	Manesy Grenadier Battalion
Column Number 2 FML Rudolf Ritter von Otto; 8,847 infantry, 1,068 cavalry	Austrian; GM Konrad Valentin von Kaim; GM Franz von Werneck	Line Infantry Regiment Kaunitz Nr. 20 (3 battalions)
Column Number 2 FML Rudolf Ritter von Otto; 8,847 infantry, 1,068 cavalry	Austrian; GM Konrad Valentin von Kaim; GM Franz von Werneck	Line Infantry Regiment Josef Colloredo Nr. 57 (2 battalions)
Column Number 2 FML Rudolf Ritter von Otto; 8,847 infantry, 1,068 cavalry	Austrian; GM Konrad Valentin von Kaim; GM Franz von Werneck	Pioneers (1/2 company)
Column Number 2 FML Rudolf Ritter von Otto; 8,847 infantry, 1,068 cavalry	Hesse-Cassel; GM Eugen von Montfrault	Hesse-Cassel Guard Grenadier Regiment (2 battalions)
Column Number 2 FML Rudolf Ritter von Otto; 8,847 infantry, 1,068 cavalry	Hesse-Cassel; GM Eugen von Montfrault	Hesse-Cassel Germann Grenadier Battalion
Column Number 2 FML Rudolf Ritter von Otto; 8,847 infantry, 1,068 cavalry	Cavalry Brigade; MG David Dundas	British 6th Dragoon Guards Regiment (3 squadrons)
Column Number 2 FML Rudolf Ritter von Otto; 8,847 infantry, 1,068 cavalry	Cavalry Brigade; MG David Dundas	British 11th Light Dragoon Regiment (2 squadrons)
Column Number 2 FML Rudolf Ritter von Otto; 8,847 infantry, 1,068 cavalry	Cavalry Brigade; MG David Dundas	Cavalry Regiment (Hussar) Kaiser Franz Nr. 2 (6 squadrons)
Column Number 2 FML Rudolf Ritter von Otto; 8,847 infantry, 1,068 cavalry	Artillery	8 × 12-pdr, 2 × howitzers
Column Number 3 Gen Frederick, Duke of York; 9,493 infantry, 1,292 cavalry, 18 guns	MG Gerard Lake	British 1/1st Foot Guards Regiment
Column Number 3 Gen Frederick, Duke of York; 9,493 infantry, 1,292 cavalry, 18 guns	MG Gerard Lake	British 1/2nd Foot Guards Regiment
Column Number 3 Gen Frederick, Duke of York; 9,493 infantry, 1,292 cavalry, 18 guns	MG Gerard Lake	British 1/3rd Foot Guards Regiment
Column Number 3 Gen Frederick, Duke of York; 9,493 infantry, 1,292 cavalry, 18 guns	MG Gerard Lake	British Converged Foot Guards Light Battalion
Column Number 3 Gen Frederick, Duke of York; 9,493 infantry, 1,292 cavalry, 18 guns	MG Henry Edward Fox	British 14th Foot Regiment
Column Number 3 Gen Frederick, Duke of York; 9,493 infantry, 1,292 cavalry, 18 guns	MG Henry Edward Fox	British 37th Foot Regiment
Column Number 3 Gen Frederick, Duke of York; 9,493 infantry, 1,292 cavalry, 18 guns	MG Henry Edward Fox	British 53rd Foot Regiment
Column Number 3 Gen Frederick, Duke of York; 9,493 infantry, 1,292 cavalry, 18 guns	Austrian	1/O'Donnell Freikorps (1 battalion)
Column Number 3 Gen Frederick, Duke of York; 9,493 infantry, 1,292 cavalry, 18 guns	Austrian	Line Infantry Regiment Tuscany Nr. 23 (2 battalions)
Column Number 3 Gen Frederick, Duke of York; 9,493 infantry, 1,292 cavalry, 18 guns	Austrian	Line Infantry Regiment Wenzel Colloredo Nr. 56 (2 battalions)
Column Number 3 Gen Frederick, Duke of York; 9,493 infantry, 1,292 cavalry, 18 guns	Austrian	Pioneers (1/2 company)
Column Number 3 Gen Frederick, Duke of York; 9,493 infantry, 1,292 cavalry, 18 guns	Hesse-Cassel	Hesse-Cassel Leib Infantry Regiment (2 battalions)
Column Number 3 Gen Frederick, Duke of York; 9,493 infantry, 1,292 cavalry, 18 guns	1st Cavalry Brigade; MG Richard Vyse	British 15th Light Dragoon Regiment (2 squadrons)
Column Number 3 Gen Frederick, Duke of York; 9,493 infantry, 1,292 cavalry, 18 guns	1st Cavalry Brigade; MG Richard Vyse	British 16th Light Dragoon Regiment (2 squadrons)
Column Number 3 Gen Frederick, Duke of York; 9,493 infantry, 1,292 cavalry, 18 guns	1st Cavalry Brigade; MG Richard Vyse	Cavalry Regiment (Hussar) Kaiser Franz Nr. 2 (4 squadrons)
Column Number 3 Gen Frederick, Duke of York; 9,493 infantry, 1,292 cavalry, 18 guns	Artillery	British Artillery: 4 × 12-pdr, 4 × 6-pdr, 6 × howitzers
Column Number 3 Gen Frederick, Duke of York; 9,493 infantry, 1,292 cavalry, 18 guns	Artillery	Austrian Artillery: 4 × 12-pdr
Column Number 4 FML Franz Joseph, Count Kinsky; 9,172 infantry, 3,494 cavalry	Austrian (Note: Brown (p. 312) listed GM Milwsk and GM Wenkel, but they could not be found in the list of Austrian generals. (Smith & Kudrna)); FML Gottlieb von Schmerzing; GM Phillipp von Heister; GM Wilhelm von Kerpen; GM Prince Joseph of Vaudémont	Tyrolean Sharpshooters (1 company)
Column Number 4 FML Franz Joseph, Count Kinsky; 9,172 infantry, 3,494 cavalry	Austrian; FML Gottlieb von Schmerzing; GM Phillipp von Heister; GM Wilhelm von Kerpen; GM Prince Joseph of Vaudémont	Slavonier Freikorps (4 companies)
Column Number 4 FML Franz Joseph, Count Kinsky; 9,172 infantry, 3,494 cavalry	Austrian; FML Gottlieb von Schmerzing; GM Phillipp von Heister; GM Wilhelm von Kerpen; GM Prince Joseph of Vaudémont	Line Infantry Regiment Karl Schröder Nr. 7 (3 battalions)
Column Number 4 FML Franz Joseph, Count Kinsky; 9,172 infantry, 3,494 cavalry	Austrian; FML Gottlieb von Schmerzing; GM Phillipp von Heister; GM Wilhelm von Kerpen; GM Prince Joseph of Vaudémont	Line Infantry Regiment Michael Wallis Nr. 11 (3 battalions)
Column Number 4 FML Franz Joseph, Count Kinsky; 9,172 infantry, 3,494 cavalry	Austrian; FML Gottlieb von Schmerzing; GM Phillipp von Heister; GM Wilhelm von Kerpen; GM Prince Joseph of Vaudémont	Cavalry Regiment (Dragoon) Karakzay Nr. 4 (6 squadrons)
Column Number 4 FML Franz Joseph, Count Kinsky; 9,172 infantry, 3,494 cavalry	Austrian; FML Gottlieb von Schmerzing; GM Phillipp von Heister; GM Wilhelm von Kerpen; GM Prince Joseph of Vaudémont	Cavalry Regiment (Hussar) Archduke Leopold Nr. 17 (4 squadrons)
Column Number 4 FML Franz Joseph, Count Kinsky; 9,172 infantry, 3,494 cavalry	Hesse-Cassel; LG Ludwig von Wurmb; GM Georg von Dalwigk	Hesse-Cassel Lentz Light Infantry Battalion
Column Number 4 FML Franz Joseph, Count Kinsky; 9,172 infantry, 3,494 cavalry	Hesse-Cassel; LG Ludwig von Wurmb; GM Georg von Dalwigk	Hesse-Cassel Kospoth Fusilier Regiment (2 battalions)
Column Number 4 FML Franz Joseph, Count Kinsky; 9,172 infantry, 3,494 cavalry	Hesse-Cassel; LG Ludwig von Wurmb; GM Georg von Dalwigk	Hesse-Cassel Eschwege Grenadier Battalion Nr. 2
Column Number 4 FML Franz Joseph, Count Kinsky; 9,172 infantry, 3,494 cavalry	Hesse-Cassel; LG Ludwig von Wurmb; GM Georg von Dalwigk	Hesse-Cassel Wurmb Grenadier Battalion Nr. 3
Column Number 4 FML Franz Joseph, Count Kinsky; 9,172 infantry, 3,494 cavalry	1st Reserve Cavalry Brigade; MG Ralph Dundas (Note: The 1st and 2nd Reserve Cavalry Brigades under MG William Erskine mistakenly followed Column Nr. 4. (Brown, p. 313))	British Royal Horse Guards Regiment (2 squadrons)
Column Number 4 FML Franz Joseph, Count Kinsky; 9,172 infantry, 3,494 cavalry	1st Reserve Cavalry Brigade; MG Ralph Dundas	British 2nd Dragoon Guards Regiment (2 squadrons)
Column Number 4 FML Franz Joseph, Count Kinsky; 9,172 infantry, 3,494 cavalry	1st Reserve Cavalry Brigade; MG Ralph Dundas	British 3rd Dragoon Guards Regiment (2 squadrons)
Column Number 4 FML Franz Joseph, Count Kinsky; 9,172 infantry, 3,494 cavalry	1st Reserve Cavalry Brigade; MG Ralph Dundas	British 1st Royal Dragoon Regiment (2 squadrons)
Column Number 4 FML Franz Joseph, Count Kinsky; 9,172 infantry, 3,494 cavalry	2nd Reserve Cavalry Brigade; MG William Harcourt	British 1st Dragoon Guards Regiment (2 squadrons)
Column Number 4 FML Franz Joseph, Count Kinsky; 9,172 infantry, 3,494 cavalry	2nd Reserve Cavalry Brigade; MG William Harcourt	British 5th Dragoon Guards Regiment (2 squadrons)
Column Number 4 FML Franz Joseph, Count Kinsky; 9,172 infantry, 3,494 cavalry	2nd Reserve Cavalry Brigade; MG William Harcourt	British 2nd Dragoon Regiment (2 squadrons)
Column Number 4 FML Franz Joseph, Count Kinsky; 9,172 infantry, 3,494 cavalry	2nd Reserve Cavalry Brigade; MG William Harcourt	British 6th Dragoon Regiment (2 squadrons)
Column Number 5 FZM Archduke Charles; 14,042 infantry, 4,007 cavalry	Austrian (Note: Brown (p. 313) listed FML Buglach, GM Nelms, and GM Radowicz, but they could not be found in the list of Austrian generals. (Smith & Kudrna)); FML József Alvinczi; GM Paul Kray; GM Karl Xavier von Finke	Tyrolean Sharpshooters (4 companies)
Column Number 5 FZM Archduke Charles; 14,042 infantry, 4,007 cavalry	Austrian; FML József Alvinczi; GM Paul Kray; GM Karl Xavier von Finke	Grenz Sharpshooters (4 companies)
Column Number 5 FZM Archduke Charles; 14,042 infantry, 4,007 cavalry	Austrian; FML József Alvinczi; GM Paul Kray; GM Karl Xavier von Finke	Malovitz Grenadier Battalion
Column Number 5 FZM Archduke Charles; 14,042 infantry, 4,007 cavalry	Austrian; FML József Alvinczi; GM Paul Kray; GM Karl Xavier von Finke	Retz Grenadier Battalion
Column Number 5 FZM Archduke Charles; 14,042 infantry, 4,007 cavalry	Austrian; FML József Alvinczi; GM Paul Kray; GM Karl Xavier von Finke	Line Infantry Regiment Murray Nr. 55 (2 battalions)
Column Number 5 FZM Archduke Charles; 14,042 infantry, 4,007 cavalry	Austrian; FML József Alvinczi; GM Paul Kray; GM Karl Xavier von Finke	Line Infantry Regiment Jordis Nr. 59 (2 battalions)
Column Number 5 FZM Archduke Charles; 14,042 infantry, 4,007 cavalry	Austrian; FML József Alvinczi; GM Paul Kray; GM Karl Xavier von Finke	Cavalry Regiment (Hussar) Kaiser Franz Nr. 2 (8 squadrons)
Column Number 5 FZM Archduke Charles; 14,042 infantry, 4,007 cavalry	Austrian; FML József Alvinczi; GM Paul Kray; GM Karl Xavier von Finke	Cavalry Regiment (Cuirassier) Zeschwitz Nr. 10 (6 squadrons)
Column Number 5 FZM Archduke Charles; 14,042 infantry, 4,007 cavalry	Austrian; FML József Alvinczi; GM Paul Kray; GM Karl Xavier von Finke	Cavalry Regiment (Hussar) Blankenstein Nr. 2 (6 squadrons)
Column Number 5 FZM Archduke Charles; 14,042 infantry, 4,007 cavalry	Austrian; FML József Alvinczi; GM Paul Kray; GM Karl Xavier von Finke	Cavalry Regiment (Dragoon) Coburg Nr. 37 (4 squadrons)
Column Number 5 FZM Archduke Charles; 14,042 infantry, 4,007 cavalry	Dutch	Dutch Prince of Orange Infantry Regiment
Column Number 5 FZM Archduke Charles; 14,042 infantry, 4,007 cavalry	Dutch	Dutch Gumoëns Infantry Regiment
Column Number 5 FZM Archduke Charles; 14,042 infantry, 4,007 cavalry	Dutch	Dutch Hirzel Infantry Regiment
Column Number 5 FZM Archduke Charles; 14,042 infantry, 4,007 cavalry	Dutch	Dutch Infantry Regiment Orange-Nassau Nr. 1
Column Number 5 FZM Archduke Charles; 14,042 infantry, 4,007 cavalry	Dutch	Dutch Infantry Regiment Van Dopf Nr. 3
Column Number 5 FZM Archduke Charles; 14,042 infantry, 4,007 cavalry	Dutch	Dutch Infantry Regiment De Bons Nr. 7
Column Number 5 FZM Archduke Charles; 14,042 infantry, 4,007 cavalry	Dutch	Dutch Infantry Regiment Hesse-Darmstadt Nr. 14
Column Number 5 FZM Archduke Charles; 14,042 infantry, 4,007 cavalry	Dutch	Dutch Van der Duijn Cavalry Regiment
Column Number 5 FZM Archduke Charles; 14,042 infantry, 4,007 cavalry	French Royalist	French Royalist Uhlans Britanniques (4 squadrons)

== See also ==
- List of orders of battle

== Notes ==
Footnotes

Citations
