= Nicolas Pierquin =

French First Coalition general

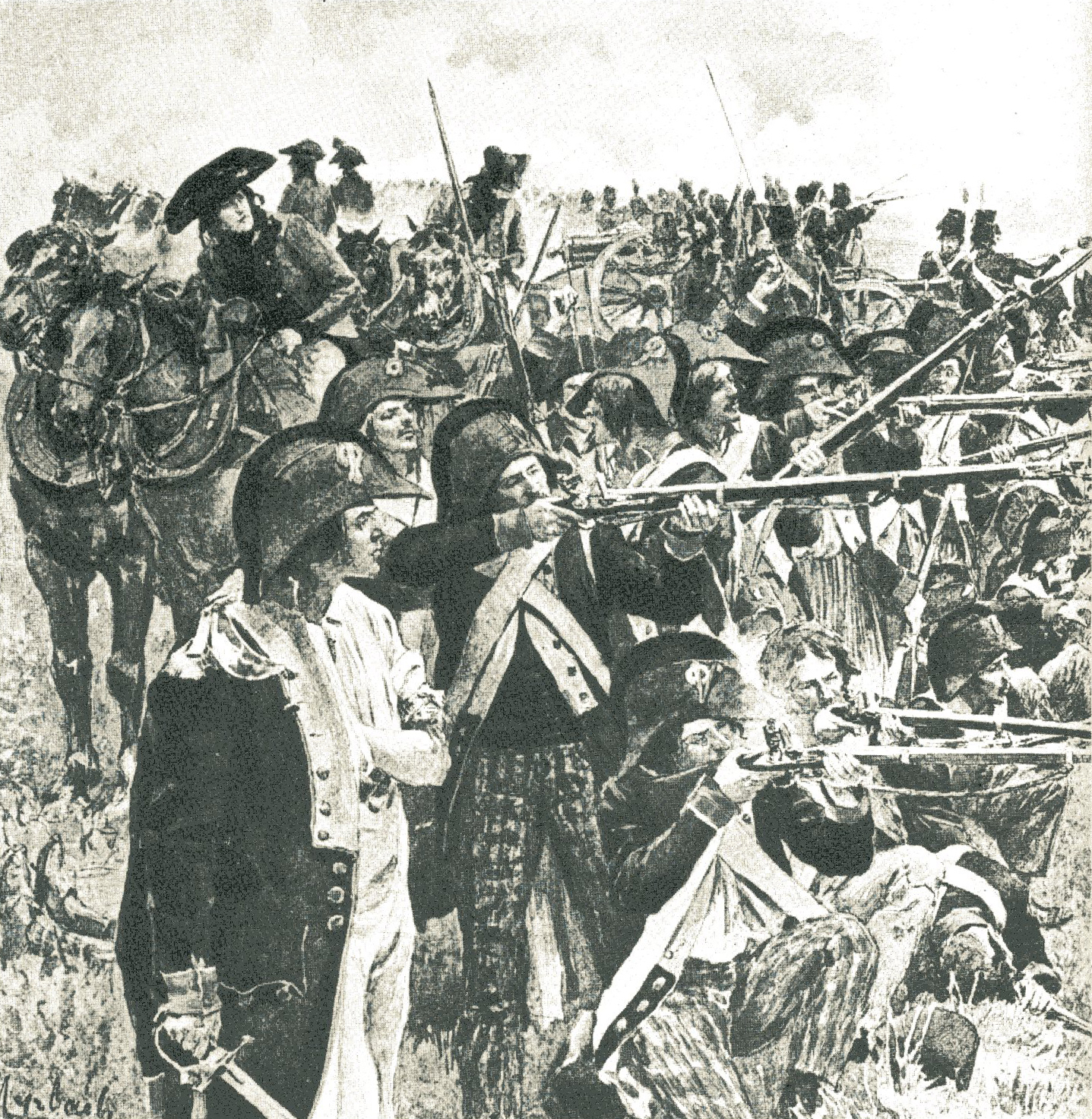
- At the Battle of Willems, French infantry in square repulsed Coalition cavalry for the first time.
- Born: 7 November 1741; Avillers-Sainte-Croix, Meuse, France
- Died: 8 June 1794 (aged 52) Lille, France
- Allegiance: Kingdom of France; France
- Branch: Infantry
- Service years: 1758–1794
- Rank: General of Brigade
- Conflicts: War of the First Coalition; Battle of Wattignies; Battle of Willems; Battle of Tourcoing †
- Awards: Order of Saint Louis, 1786

Nicholas Pierquin (French pronunciation: [nikɔlɑ pjɛʁkɛ̃]; 7 November 1741 – 8 June 1794) enlisted in the French Royal Army in 1759 and was appointed captain in 1791. With the start of the War of the First Coalition, promotions became rapid and he was elevated to the rank of general of brigade in September 1793. He fought at Wattignies in the Low Countries theatre of the War of the First Coalition. He led a division-sized unit at the start of 1794. He led his troops during the battles of Willems and Tourcoing and he was mortally wounded in the latter action.

== Early career ==
Nicolas Pierquin was born at Avillers-Sainte-Croix in what later became Meuse department, France, on 7 November 1741. He joined the militia on 26 October 1758. He enlisted in the Regiment of Barrois on 3 January 1759 and was promoted sergeant on 21 February 1762. He transferred to the Regiment of Foix, which later became the 83rd Regiment, on 7 July 1763. He became the flag-bearer on 11 September 1763 and served in the French colonies and at sea from 1763–1765. Pierquin was promoted sous-lieutenant of grenadiers on 23 January 1772, second lieutenant on 8 April 1785, and first lieutenant on 29 June 1786. He was awarded the Order of Saint Louis on 27 July 1786. He was elevated to the rank of captain on 1 April 1791 and captain of grenadiers on 1 February 1792.

== War of the First Coalition ==
After King Louis XVI's Flight to Varennes in June 1791, a large-scale exodus of noble officers from the Royal Army commenced. The vacant positions had to be filled by the remaining officers, or by promotions from the ranks. This allowed for rapid promotions for lower-ranking soldiers with military experience. In 1792 and 1793, Pierquin was assigned to the Army of the Ardennes. He was promoted second lieutenant colonel of a grenadier battalion on 21 October 1792. For part of this period, he was the temporary commandant of the fortress of Mariembourg. He was elevated in rank to general of brigade on 13 September 1793.

During the Battle of Wattignies on 15–16 October 1793, a 3,500-man column under Jacob Job Elie advanced from Philippeville, well to the east of the major fighting. Two-thirds of the troops were poorly trained and when the column encountered Allied opposition, the men panicked and fled. Near Boussu-lez-Walcourt, Elie managed to rally them and get them back into formation. Attacked again in a heavy fog, the raw troops in the second line fired into the backs of the first line then threw down their firearms and ran away. In Elie's report, he noted that Pierquin's horse was killed under him while they were trying to rally the fleeing soldiers. Pierquin was suspended by the Représentant en mission on 10 November 1793, but he was soon reinstated and reassigned to the Army of the North.

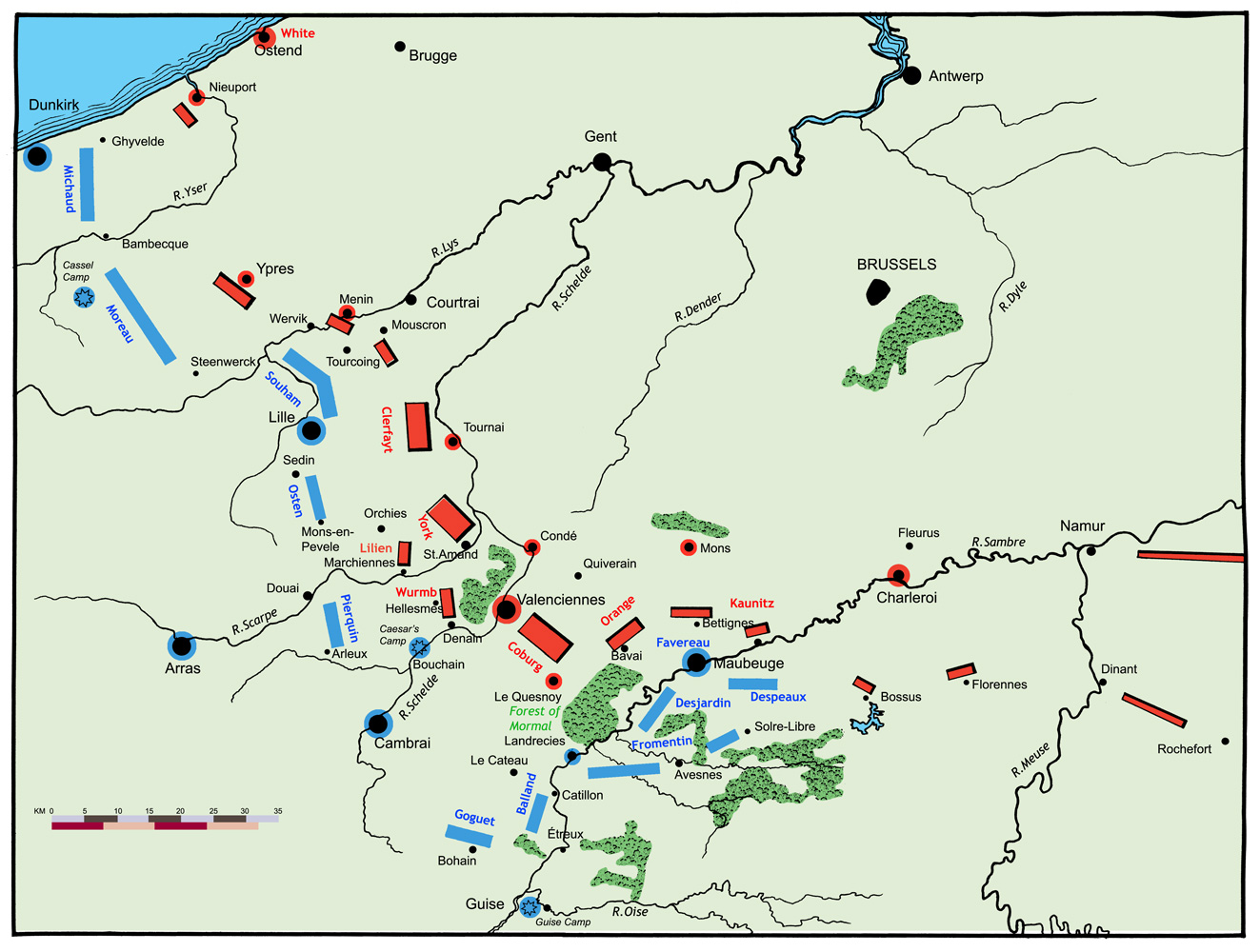
Northeast France in early April 1794: Pierquin's division is east of Arras and north of Cambrai. French units are blue; Coalition units are red.

The French levée en masse of 23 August 1793 created a very large, but unwieldy army at the beginning of the following year. To make this huge force more manageable, one regular battalion and two volunteer battalions were being united to form 3,200-man demi-brigades. In March 1794, Jean-Charles Pichegru's Army of the North numbered 194,930, including garrisons. In addition, the Army of the Ardennes, 32,773-strong, was subordinate to Pichegru. The 71,000-man French left wing consisted of the divisions of Pierre Antoine Michaud, Jean Victor Marie Moreau, Joseph Souham, and Pierre-Jacques Osten. The 47,000-strong center was made up of the divisions of Pierquin, Jacques Gilles Henri Goguet, and Antoine Balland. The 36,000-man right wing included the divisions of Jacques Fromentin, Jacques Desjardin. and Éloi Laurent Despeaux.

An order of battle dated 19 April 1794 showed that Pierquin's division included the brigades of Pierquin and Jacques Philippe Bonnaud, and it was located at the Camp of Arleux. The division included 1,014 cavalry in three regiments, 155 gunners, and 16 gendarmes. There were also two regular and six volunteer battalions with a total of 7,245 infantry. Within the next two weeks, Pichegru ordered the division, now under the command of Bonnaud, to move from Cambrai to the area near Lille.

In the Battle of Willems on 10 May, the French thrust eastward with Souham's division on the left, Bonnaud's 23,000-man division in the center, and Osten's 6,000 soldiers on the right. Advancing from Sainghin, were Bonnaud's infantry brigades under Pierquin, Jean-Baptiste Salme, and Pierre Nöel, and cavalry under Antoine Baillot-Faral. This force crossed the Marque River and enjoyed initial success. The British commander, the Prince Frederick, Duke of York and Albany sent 16 British and 2 Austrian squadrons against Bonnaud's southern flank. Bonnaud's infantry formed square and repelled ten consecutive cavalry charges. British artillery and infantry were brought forward and 6 more British cavalry squadrons reinforced the attackers. An eleventh charge finally broke three squares and the French fled after sustaining 2,000 casualties and losing 13 guns. The French admitted losing only 500 men and 5 guns.

At the Battle of Tourcoing was fought on 17–18 May 1794 and resulted in a French victory. Bonnaud directed a division (really a corps) that was made up of the divisions of Osten (7,478 men), Pierquin (11,079 men), Louis Fursy Henri Compère (5,690 men), Jean François Thierry (6,404 men), and Baillot (3,404 cavalry). The Coalition planned to pinch off a French salient at Kortrijk (Courtrai) containing the divisions of Souham and Moreau. One column would come down from the north and cross the Lys River at Wervik. Meanwhile, five more columns would advance from the south and meet the northern column near Tourcoing. On the first day, only the columns of the Duke of York and Rudolf Ritter von Otto made good progress, while one column was driven back, and the other columns fell behind schedule. On the second day, Moreau's division blocked the northern column, while the divisions of Souham and Bonnaud counterattacked and mauled York and Otto. During the battle, Pierquin was shot through the right knee and died of his wound on 8 June.
