= Avillers =

Avillers is the name or part of the name of the following communes in France:

- Avillers, Meurthe-et-Moselle, in the Meurthe-et-Moselle department
- Avillers, Vosges, in the Vosges department
- Avillers-Sainte-Croix, in the Meuse department
