= Jean-Baptiste Olivier =

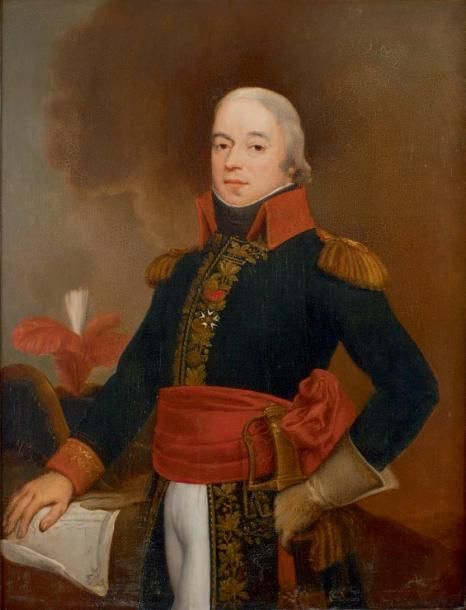
- Portrait of general Jean-Baptiste Olivier
- Born: 25 December 1765; Strasbourg, Haut-Rhin, France
- Died: 27 September 1813 (aged 47) Witternesse, Pas-de-Calais, France
- Allegiance: France
- Branch: Infantry
- Service years: 1781–1813
- Rank: General of Division
- Conflicts: French Revolutionary Wars; Napoleonic Wars
- Awards: Légion d'Honneur, Grand Officer; Order of the Iron Crown
- Other work: Baron of the Empire

Jean-Baptiste Olivier (French pronunciation: [ʒɑ̃ batist ɔlivje]; 25 December 1765 – 27 September 1813) enlisted in the French Royal Army as a foot soldier in 1781. During the French Revolutionary Wars he was promoted general of brigade, fighting at Kaiserslautern, Fleurus, and Neuwied. He famously observed the action at Fleurus from a hot air balloon. In 1799 he transferred to the Army of Naples as a general of division. He fought at the Trebbia where he was severely wounded, losing a leg. During the Napoleonic Wars he held military commands in the interior and was appointed Baron of the Empire and Grand Officer of the Légion d'honneur. He died in 1813. Olivier is one of the names inscribed under the Arc de Triomphe.

== Early career ==
Olivier was born on 25 December 1765 at Strasbourg, France. He enlisted in the Aquitaine Infantry Regiment in December 1781, the same unit in which his father had served. The Aquitaine Regiment was later numbered the 35th Regiment. Olivier received promotion to corporal on 1 January 1782 and sergeant on 15 June 1785. In 1790, he requested leave from the regiment and joined the 4th Battalion of the Moselle Volunteers on 25 August 1791 as an adjutant major. He was promoted chef de bataillon (major) on 15 June 1792. The 4th Moselle served under René Charles de Ligniville in the unsuccessful operation against Trier in December 1792.

== Brigade commander ==
Skipping over the intermediate rank of chef de brigade (colonel), Olivier was elevated to the rank of general of brigade on 19 September 1793. At the Battle of Kaiserslautern on 28–30 November 1793, he led a brigade in Jean-Jacques Ambert's division in Lazare Hoche's Army of the Moselle. The brigade consisted of 1 battalion and 4 squadrons of the Légion of the Moselle, 1 battalion of the 13th Line Infantry Regiment, 4 squadrons of the 2nd Carabinier Regiment, and a 6-gun horse artillery company. On 1 December 1793, he was arrested and charged with pillaging and looting and only returned to duty the following April.

On 30 April 1794, Jean-Baptiste Jourdan, commanding the Army of the Moselle, was ordered to send a strong force toward Namur. Interpreting his orders broadly, Jourdan moved north with the divisions of François Joseph Lefebvre, Jean Étienne Championnet, Antoine Morlot, and Jacques Maurice Hatry, totaling 31,548 effectives, leaving Jean René Moreaux in charge of the remainder of the Army of the Moselle. In early June, Jourdan's four divisions joined the five divisions under Jacques Desjardin and Louis Charbonnier fighting on the Sambre River. This new force would soon become known as the Army of Sambre and Meuse under Jourdan.

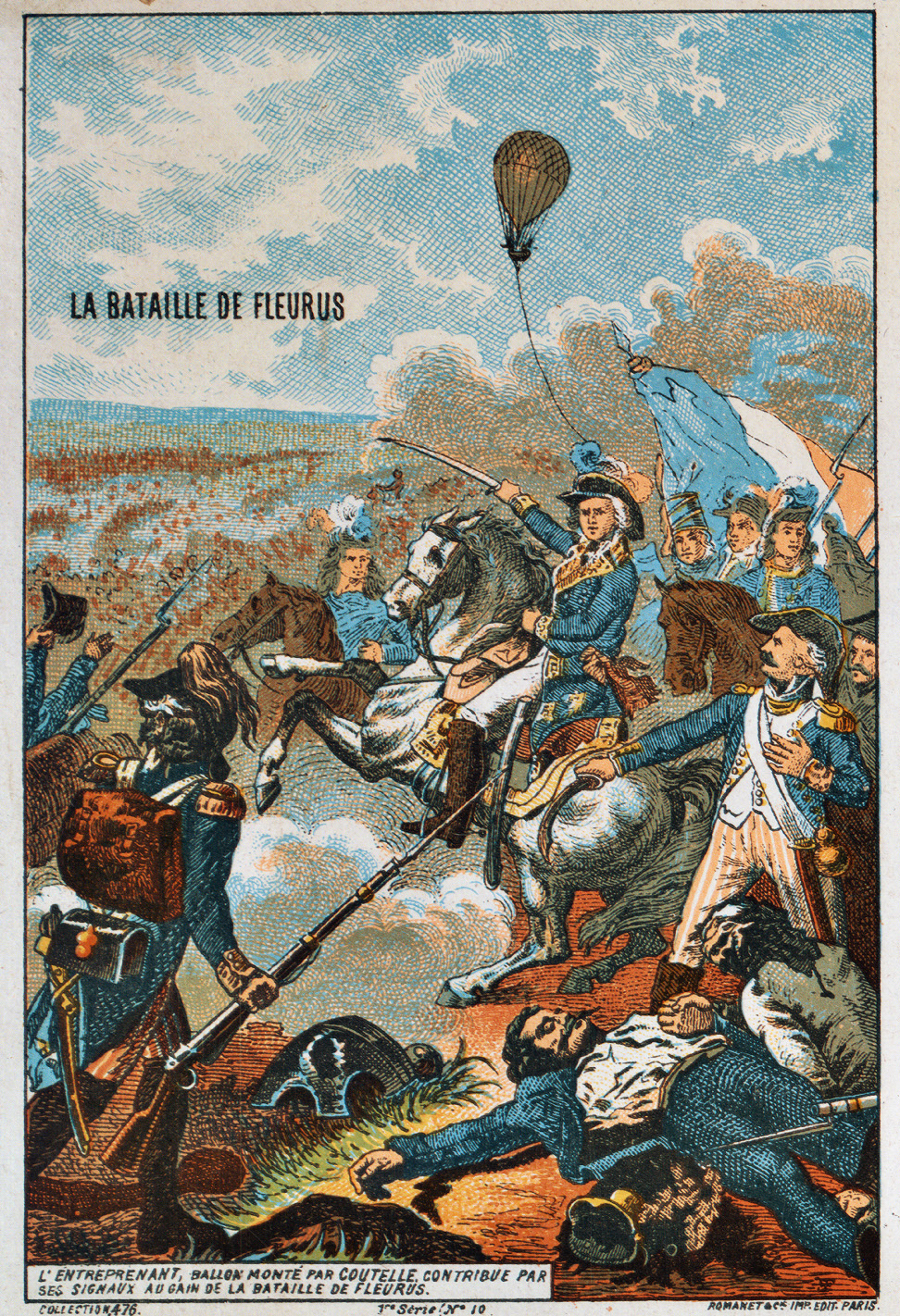
Balloon at the Battle of Fleurus

On 16 June 1794, Jourdan was defeated in the Battle of Lambusart. William V, Prince of Orange with 43,000 Allies met Jourdan with 58,000 men in a heavy fog. Jean-Baptiste Kléber on the French left flank beat the Coalition troops in front of him. Jourdan wanted Kléber to wheel to his right to aid Morlot's men who were fighting in the centre. The fog lifted, revealing that the Army of the Ardennes soldiers under François Séverin Marceau on the French right flank had fled. Jourdan's army was compelled to retreat after losing 3,000 casualties and 8 guns, while capturing 7 guns and inflicting 2,796 casualties on the Allies.

The French attacked again and won the Battle of Fleurus on 26 June. In this action, Olivier commanded a brigade in Morlot's division. It included 3 battalions of the 110th Line Infantry Regiment and 3 squadrons of the 14th Dragoon Regiment. At some time during the battle, Olivier went up in a captive hot air balloon to observe the Coalition positions. He later named his son Fleurus to commemorate his part in the victory. At Fleurus, Jourdan's 75,000 men were attacked by the 52,000-strong Coalition army under Prince Josias of Saxe-Coburg-Saalfeld deployed in five converging columns. Kléber held the left flank with two divisions, Championnet, Morlot, and Lefebvre held the centre, and Marceau the right, with Hatry and the cavalry in reserve. Once again, Marceau's troops bolted, but this time Lefebvre's division held firm and repulsed all the attacks of the enemy. Morlot and Championnet were so hard-pressed that Jourdan pulled Morlot's troops back a little. Marceau rallied some soldiers while Jourdan carefully fed his reserves into the front line. After an all-day struggle, the Allies finally stopped attacking and withdrew.

In the Rhine campaign of 1795, Olivier commanded a brigade in Paul Grenier's division in Jourdan's Army of Sambre and Meuse. The division included the 110th, 112th, 172nd, and 173rd Line Infantry Regiments, the 19th Chasseur à cheval and 4th Hussar Regiments. During the Rhine campaign of 1796 Olivier was given charge of Grenier's cavalry. At the passage of the Lahn River, he charged the enemy rearguard and captured 130 Austrians. On 10 July, he defeated two Austrian squadrons at Grunselheim. He fought at Giessen in September during the retreat. Olivier distinguished himself in the defense of the Neuwied bridgehead in October.

== Division commander ==
=== Army of Sambre and Meuse ===
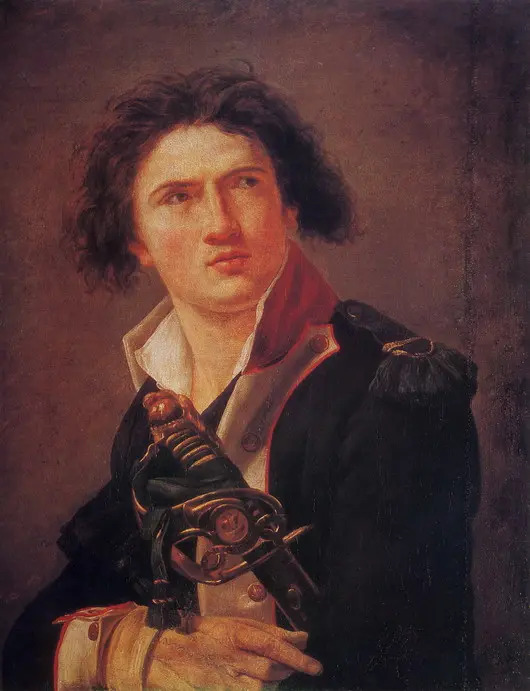
Lazare Hoche

On 24 January 1797, Hoche was appointed commander of the Army of Sambre and Meuse, which numbered 78,000 men present for duty. Hoche reorganized the army into three corps, each with two infantry divisions and one cavalry division, plus the Hunsrück Corps of two divisions. Grenier commanded the centre corps, which included Grenier's own division, Olivier's division, and Michel Ney's Hussar division, a total of 16,596 soldiers. Immediately opposite Hoche's army was Franz von Werneck with 28,841 men including 8,052 soldiers under Paul Kray at Neuwied. A 5,539-strong reserve under Joseph Anton von Simbschen was also available.

Hoche ordered his left corps under Championnet to move south from Düsseldorf to distract Werneck, then attacked Kray's outnumbered force with 50,000 men. During the Battle of Neuwied on 18 April, the first assaults of Grenier's corps failed against Kray's line of strong redoubts. Then Ney's cavalry found a gap between two redoubts and attacked from the rear. By noon, the French captured all the redoubts and later in the day routed 6,000 Austrian reserves. Olivier's troops seized the redoubts and the village of Bendorf. Hoche next detached Grenier's division to assist Lefebvre's right corps, while taking Olivier's division and Ney's cavalry northeast toward Altenkirchen. Hoche hoped to trap Werneck, but the Austrians managed to slip away. Next, Hoche tried to catch Werneck between Championnet and Olivier's division, but the Austrian also evaded this snare, escaping through Wetzlar. On 23 April 1797, word reached the armies that the Treaty of Leoben had been signed on 18 April. This ended the fighting.

By the secret clauses of the Treaty of Campo Formio, the Holy Roman Empire agreed to cede the Electorate of Mainz to France. Accordingly, the newly created French Army of Mainz under Hatry invested Mainz on 20 December 1797 and demanded that the Elector of Mainz surrender the city. Hatry's army included the infantry divisions of Olivier, Lefebvre, Championnet, Grenier, and Jean Hardy, and Ney's Hussar division. The French occupied the city on 30 December 1797 and did not relinquish it until 1814. Subsequently, Olivier served with the Army of England and the Army of Italy before being transferred to the Army of Naples in early 1799. He was promoted general of division on 22 May 1799.

=== Army of Naples ===
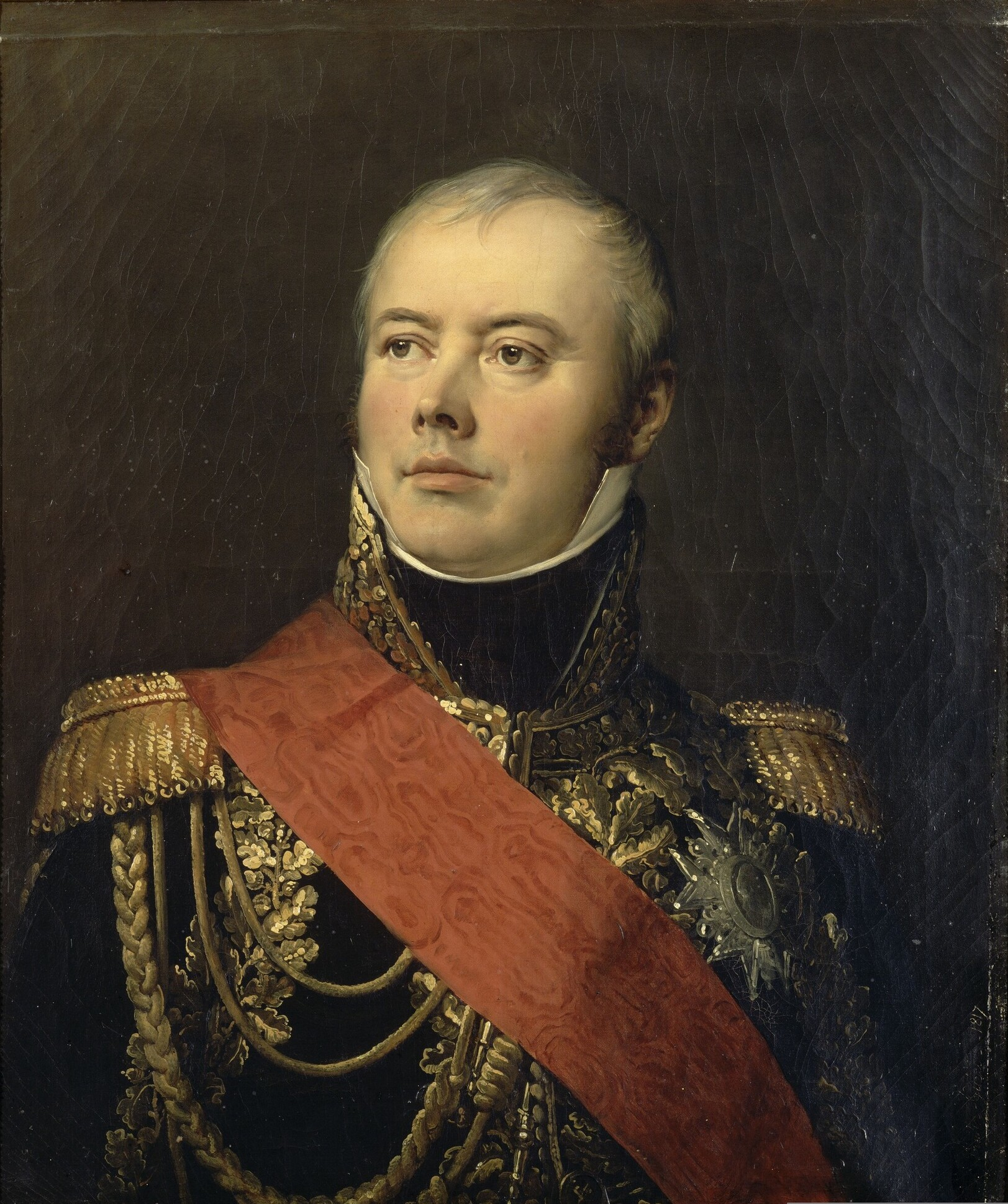
Étienne Macdonald

While in Étienne Macdonald's Army of Naples, Olivier's division was employed putting down a revolt in Calabria in which the insurgents were defeated. On 14 April 1799, Macdonald received orders to leave garrisons in southern Italy and march to join the Army of Italy in the north. Olivier's division had to be recalled from an expedition to Brindisi and did not rejoin the army until 26 April. In May 1799, the Army of Naples had 36,728 troops available for the field, not including garrisons. The army counted an advance guard and six infantry divisions, of which Olivier led the 1st Division. Olivier was described as "a brave but not a very good General". As the army moved north, discipline broke down, and marauding soldiers threatened to kill officers who tried to stop them. According to Paul Thiébault, Olivier was so ashamed of his troops' behaviour that he vowed to get himself killed in the first battle, so as to avoid disgrace.

Macdonald's army moved north, reaching Rome on 16 May 1799 and Florence on 26 May. The most secure route to join the Army of Italy was via the west coast, but Macdonald opted to take the bolder and riskier route across the Apennine Mountains toward Piacenza. Macdonald accompanied the centre column, composed of the divisions of Olivier and François Watrin, which marched from Pistoia to Modena. On 12 June, the center column attacked Prince Friedrich Franz Xaver of Hohenzollern-Hechingen's 4,000 infantry and 800 cavalry in the Battle of Modena. The Austrians suffered 2,000 casualties in this defeat, but in a chance encounter, Macdonald was wounded by a party of cavalrymen. After the battle, Macdonald ordered the divisions of Olivier and Joseph Hélie Désiré Perruquet de Montrichard northward in a feint toward the Siege of Mantua. Consequently, these divisions missed the initial fighting at the Battle of Trebbia on 17–20 June.

At the Trebbia, Olivier's division included the 12th Line (1,374), 30th Line (1,480), and 73rd Line (1,980) Infantry Regiments, the 7th (327) and 19th (361) Chasseurs à cheval Regiments, and 304 gunners and sappers, a total of 5,826 men. Macdonald's bold offensive was anticipated by France's enemies; Alexander Suvorov moved the Austro-Russian army by forced marches to oppose him. On 17 June, Macdonald launched an attack by the 18,700 troops that were available. As the day wore on, the Austro-Russian forces increased in numbers from 5,000 to 30,656; the French withdrew behind the Trebbia River. The divisions of Olivier and Montrichard reached the battlefield at 2:30 pm on 18 June. They attacked the Austrians opposing them, but were forced back behind the Trebbia.

Olivier's division was supposed to attack at 10:00 am on 19 June, but had to wait because Montrichard's division was late. At 11:00 am, Olivier's assault was delivered, and it surprised and routed the Austrians facing it. The French troops were only halted when Johann I, Prince of Liechtenstein led a cavalry charge against their left flank. On Olivier's left, Montrichard's assault was met with intense fire and collapsed in rout. With no support on its left, Olivier's division was compelled to withdraw. Macdonald decided to retreat that evening, though every Allied attempt to cross to the east bank of the Trebbia had been beaten back. The French defeat was the result of attacking across too wide a front and poor cooperation between the divisions. The French suffered 1,600 killed and abandoned 502 officers and 7,183 men wounded in Piacenza. These totals included wounded Generals Olivier, Jean-Baptiste Dominique Rusca, and Jean-Baptiste Salme who became Allied prisoners. Olivier, who lost a leg, told Macdonald, "I shed my blood for the Republic: it is nothing; how go our affairs?"

== Later career ==
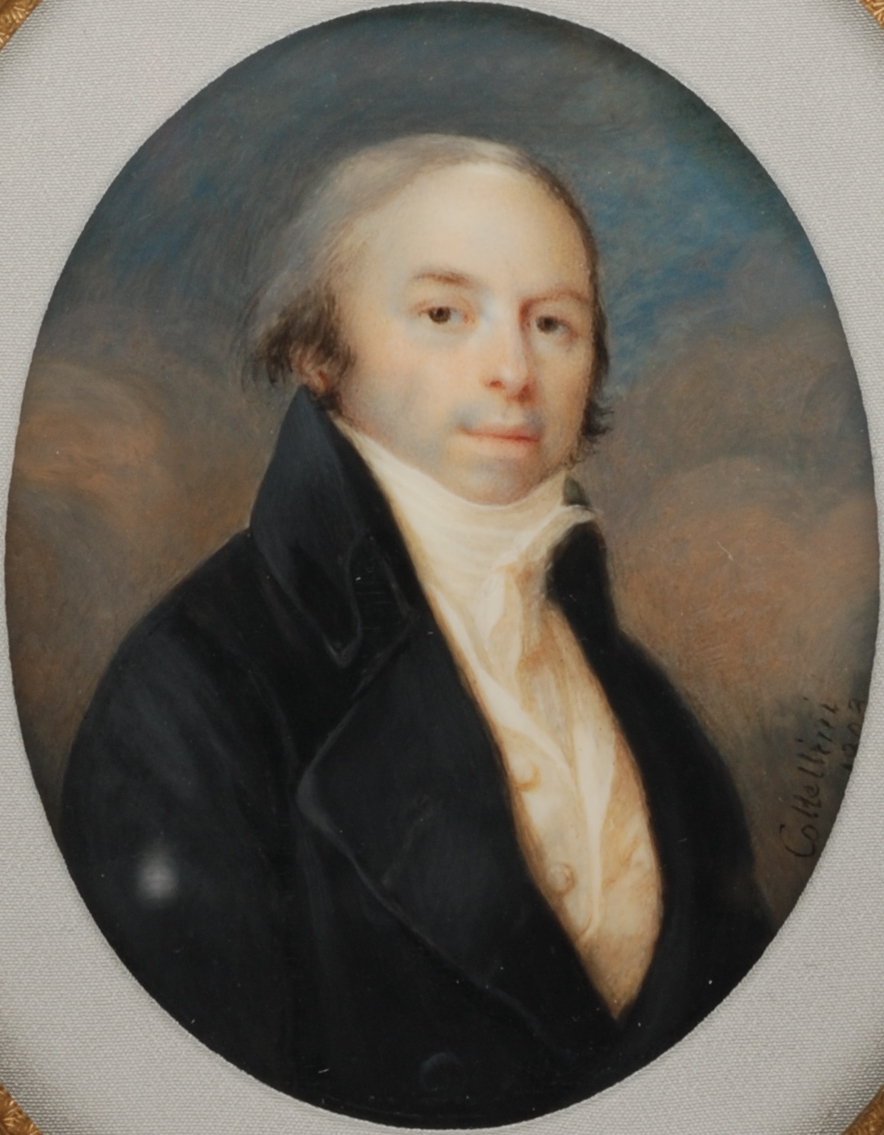
Jean-Baptiste, baron Olivier, miniature by Constantina Cortellini, 1803 (Museum Rotterdam)

Napoleon Bonaparte named Olivier Inspector of Reviews in 1800. He went to serve in the Italian Republic and in 1803 was appointed commander at Brescia. In 1804, he was named a Grand Officer of the Legion of Honour. In 1805, Olivier was appointed commander of the 20th Military Division. On 4 April 1809 he assumed command of the 16th Military Division at Lille and received the Order of the Iron Crown. In August that year he joined the army assembling on the Scheldt, and in September he briefly led a National Guard division under Bon-Adrien Jeannot de Moncey. In November 1809 he resumed command of the 16th Military Division. In 1811 he became a Baron of the Empire. While touring his military division, he died on 21 October 1813 at the Château de Saint-André in Witternesse, France. OLIVIER is inscribed on column 7 on the northern pillar of the Arc de Triomphe.

== Sources ==
- Broughton, Tony (2007). "Generals Who Served in the French Army during the Period 1789-1815: Obert to Oyre". The Napoleon Series.
- Duffy, Christopher (1999). Eagles Over the Alps: Suvarov in Italy and Switzerland, 1799. Chicago, Ill.: The Emperor's Press. ISBN 1-883476-18-6.
- Jensen, Nathan D. (2018). "Jean Baptiste Olivier (1765-1813)". frenchempire.net.
- Mullié, Charles (1852). Biographie des célébrités militaires des armées de terre et de mer de 1789 a 1850: Olivier (Jean-Baptiste) (in French). Paris.
- Phipps, Ramsay Weston (2011a) [1929]. The Armies of the First French Republic and the Rise of the Marshals of Napoleon I: The Armées du Moselle, du Rhin, de Sambre-et-Meuse, de Rhin-et-Moselle. Vol. 2. Pickle Partners Publishing. ISBN 978-1-908692-25-2.
- Phipps, Ramsay Weston (2011b) [1939]. The Armies of the First French Republic and the Rise of the Marshals of Napoleon I: The Armies of the Rhine in Switzerland, Holland, Italy, Egypt, and the Coup d'Etat of Brumaire (1797-1799). Vol. 5. Pickle Partners Publishing. ISBN 978-1-908692-28-3.
- Smith, Digby (1998). The Napoleonic Wars Data Book. London: Greenhill. ISBN 1-85367-276-9.
