= Aillianville =

- Commune
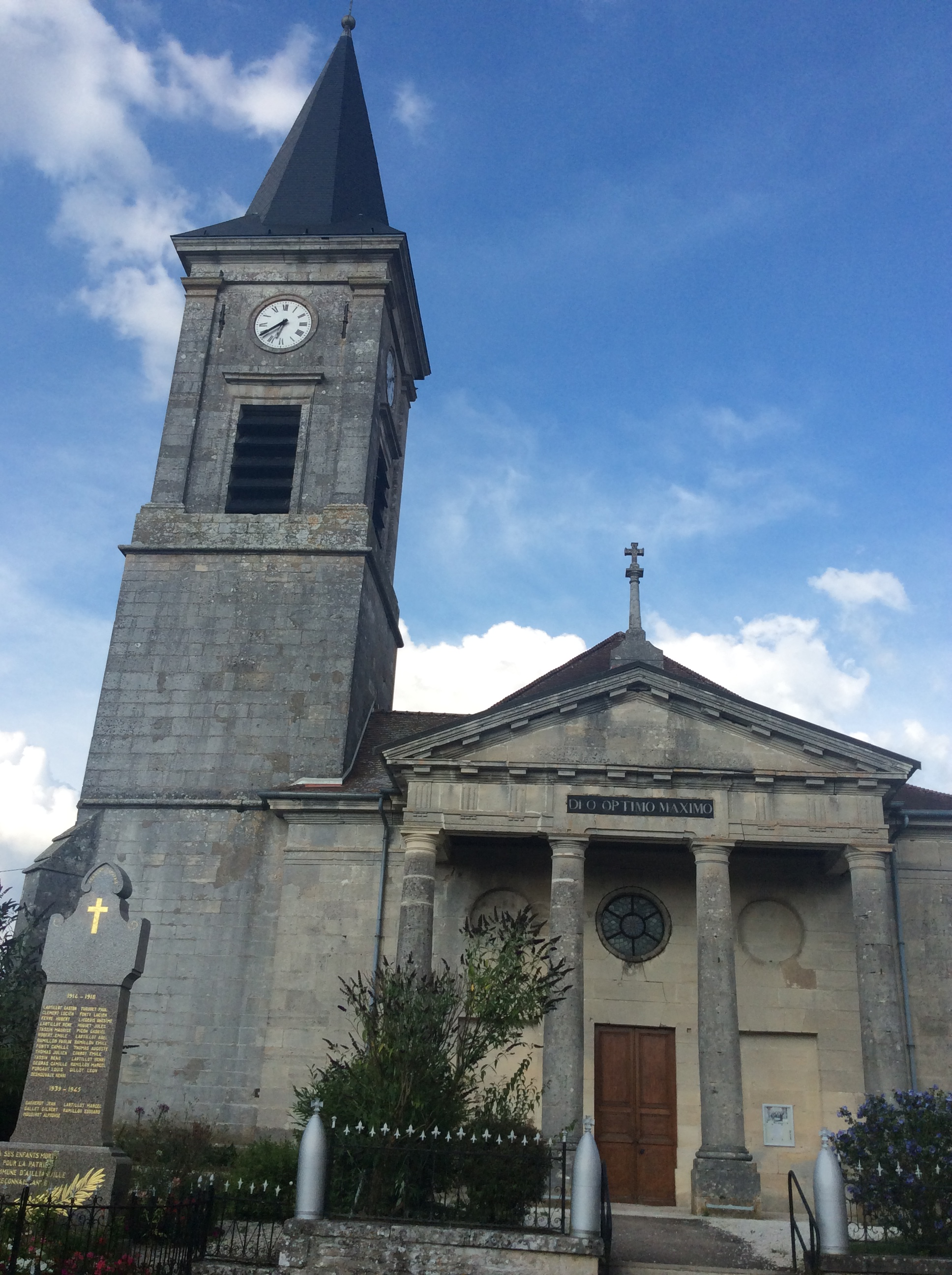
- The church in Aillianville

- Coat of arms
- Location of Aillianville
- Location within France Location within Grand Est
- Coordinates: 48°20′31″N 5°28′41″E
- Country: France
- Region: Grand Est
- Department: Haute-Marne
- Arrondissement: Chaumont
- Canton: Poissons
- Intercommunality: Meuse Rognon

Government
  - Mayor (2020–2026): Philippe Leroux
- Area^{1}: 23.63 km^{2} (9.12 sq mi)
- Elevation: 428 m (1,404 ft)
- Population (2023): 148
  - Density: 6.26/km^{2} (16.2/sq mi)
- Time zone: UTC+01:00 (CET)
  - Summer (DST): UTC+02:00 (CEST)
- INSEE/Postal code: 52003 /52700
- ^{1} French Land Register data, which excludes lakes, ponds, glaciers > 1 km^{2} (0.386 sq mi or 247 acres) and river estuaries.

Aillianville is a commune in the Haute-Marne department in Grand Est region in northeastern France.

== Population ==
Historical population
Year	Pop.	±% p.a.
1968	295	—
1975	229	−3.55%
1982	203	−1.71%
1990	194	−0.57%
1999	185	−0.53%
2007	164	−1.49%
2012	167	+0.36%
2017	165	−0.24%
2023	148	−1.80%
Source: INSEE

== See also ==
- Communes of the Haute-Marne department
