= Jean-Baptiste Salme =

- Born: 18 November 1766; Aillianville, France
- Died: 27 May 1811 (aged 44) Tarragona, Spain
- Allegiance: France
- Branch: Cavalry, Infantry
- Service years: 1784–1811
- Rank: General of Division
- Conflicts: War of the First Coalition; Battle of Haguenau; Second Battle of Wissembourg; Battle of Tourcoing; Battle of Tournay; Siege of Ypres; Siege of Grave; War of the Second Coalition; Battle of Trebbia (POW); Saint-Domingue; War of the Fifth Coalition; Walcheren Campaign; Peninsular War; Siege of Tarragona †
- Awards: Légion d'Honneur, 1811

Jean-Baptiste Salme or Salm (18 November 1766 – 27 May 1811) was a French general. He led French troops in several actions during the French Revolutionary Wars and Napoleonic Wars. Several times he landed in trouble by associating with the wrong people, including his wife who tried to kill him. He served alongside Jacques MacDonald when they were both generals of brigade in the Flanders Campaign in 1794. Still commanding only a brigade, he served in MacDonald's army in Italy during 1799 and in Spain during 1810.

In 1784, he joined a dragoon regiment in the French Royal Army in 1784. He emerged as the commanding officer of the 3rd Infantry Demi-brigade in the Army of the Rhine in 1793. He led his unit at Haguenau and Second Wissembourg. In 1794, he transferred to northeast France and was promoted to general officer, subsequently fighting at Tourcoing, Tournay and Hooglede. After besieging and capturing the fortress of Grave he was on occupation duty in Belgium and Holland.

Salme's friendship with the traitor Jean-Charles Pichegru caused him to be unemployed for over a year. He served in Italy in 1798 and led the army advance guard at the Trebbia in 1799 where he was wounded and captured by the Austrians. In 1802 he went on the Saint-Domingue expedition to Haiti but was sent home early, possibly for having a sexual liaison with Pauline Bonaparte. Then his wife tried to poison him and he was retired from the army. In 1809 he briefly led a second-line outfit in the Walcheren Campaign. The following year he was given a brigade and served in Catalonia. He was killed in action during the Siege of Tarragona in 1811. His surname is one of the names inscribed under the Arc de Triomphe, on Column 38.

== Early career ==
Salme was born on 18 November 1766 in Aillianville to father Jean Baptiste Salme and mother Marie Jeanne Vignon. The godparents at the baptism were Nicolas Salme and Marie Gérard, the paternal grandfather and his second wife. Salme's father was a laborer and later became a timber merchant in 1784. Jean-Baptiste père was accused of misappropriating civic funds in 1789. The father's membership in the bourgeoisie may have aroused suspicion, causing him some trouble in May 1793, but he went on to become mayor in 1807. Jean Baptiste fils was well-educated by his uncle Gaspard who was a parish priest.

Against his parents' wishes, Salme ran off and enlisted in the Tribois company of the Noailles Dragoon Regiment on 16 April 1784. The unit's commander was Philippe Louis de Noailles and its garrison town was Épinal. The youthful dragoon was described as five feet four inches tall with light brown hair. He was round-faced and had a smallpox scar on his nose. He remained a simple private during his early military career, serving in garrison at Toulouse and Carcassonne in 1788 and Montauban in 1790. His father finally persuaded him that there was no future for him in the army and he left the service on 12 January 1791.

== War of the First Coalition ==
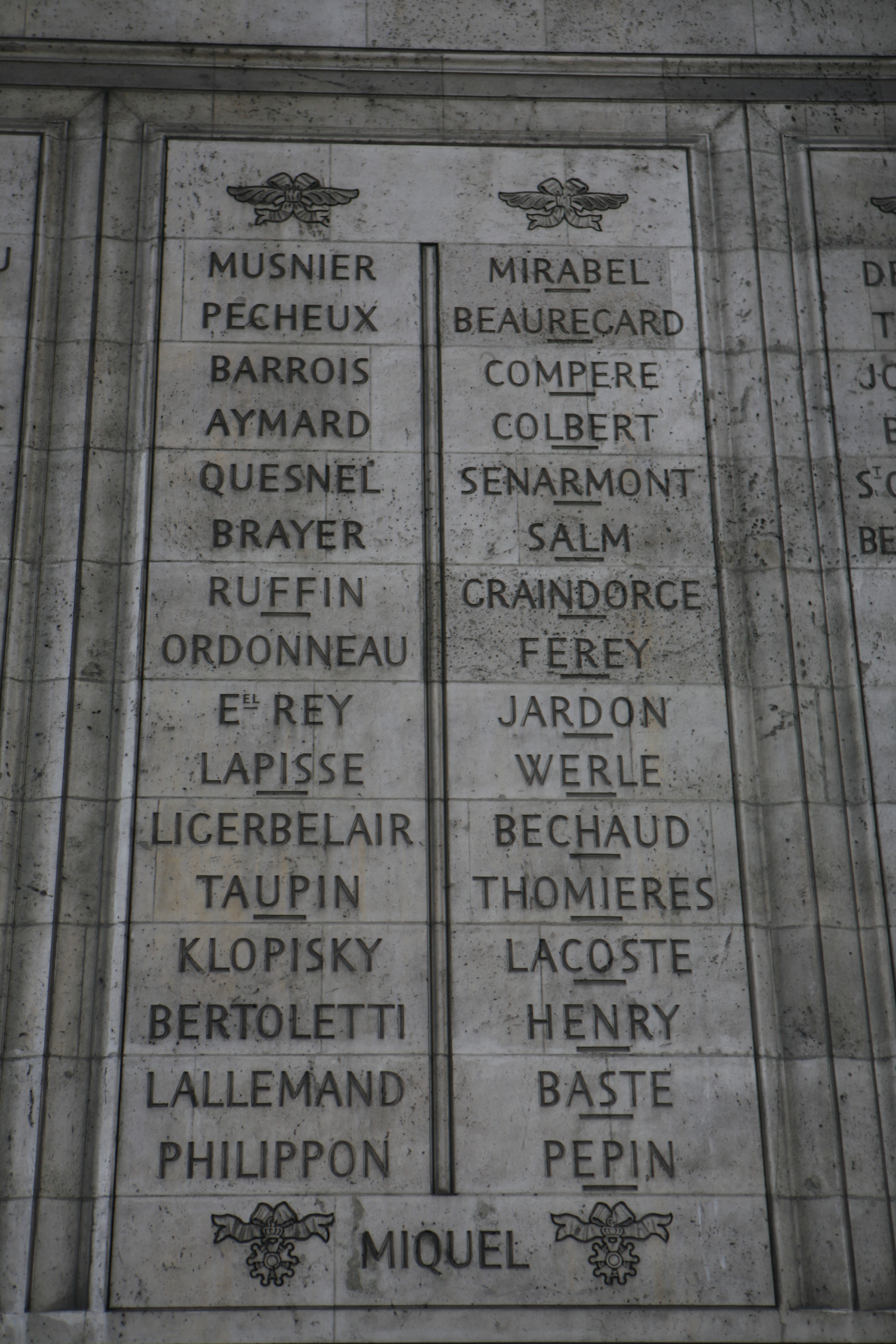
SALM is name 6 on Column 38.

On 9 July 1791 a law provided for the formation of volunteer battalions and Salme joined the 1st Battalion of the Vosges National Guard at Neufchâteau. Recognizing his former service as a dragoon, the old soldier who commanded the battalion made him a sergeant. Salme so enthusiastically participated in the training of the battalion while it was cantoned at Saverne that he was promoted to sous-lieutenant on 15 April 1792. He was married the next day to Jeanne Henriette Masse. War broke out on 20 April and the battalion was ordered to the front on 19 July. Salme was involved in operations around the Prussian siege of Longwy, being wounded at Rülzheim on 3 August 1792. The 1st Vosges Battalion was present at the capture of Speyer on 30 September when Adam Philippe, Comte de Custine's 24,000-man Army of the Rhine trapped 3,600 Imperial troops in a bend of the Rhine River. In the spring of 1793 the 1st Vosges was in Jean Nicolas Houchard's 1st Brigade of Joseph Victorin Nevinger's Left Wing near Bingen am Rhein. On 14 September 1793 Salme greatly distinguished himself in an action at Nothweiler in which he was wounded.

On 7 October 1793 Salme was named lieutenant colonel of the 15th Vosges Battalion, a unit of raw and undisciplined conscripts. Soon after, he was appointed to lead the 3rd Line Infantry Demi-brigade as Chef de brigade (colonel) on 28 October. On 30 October the 3rd Line belonged to the army's Center which was led by Louis Dominique Munnier. During the subsequent Battle of Haguenau, Salme seized Bettenhoffen from the Austrians on 1 December and fought at Berstheim, winning commendation from army commander Jean-Charles Pichegru. On 18 December his unit fought Austrian hussars and he was wounded in the arm by a saber-cut. Nevertheless, he led his regiment in the Second Battle of Wissembourg on 26 December 1793.

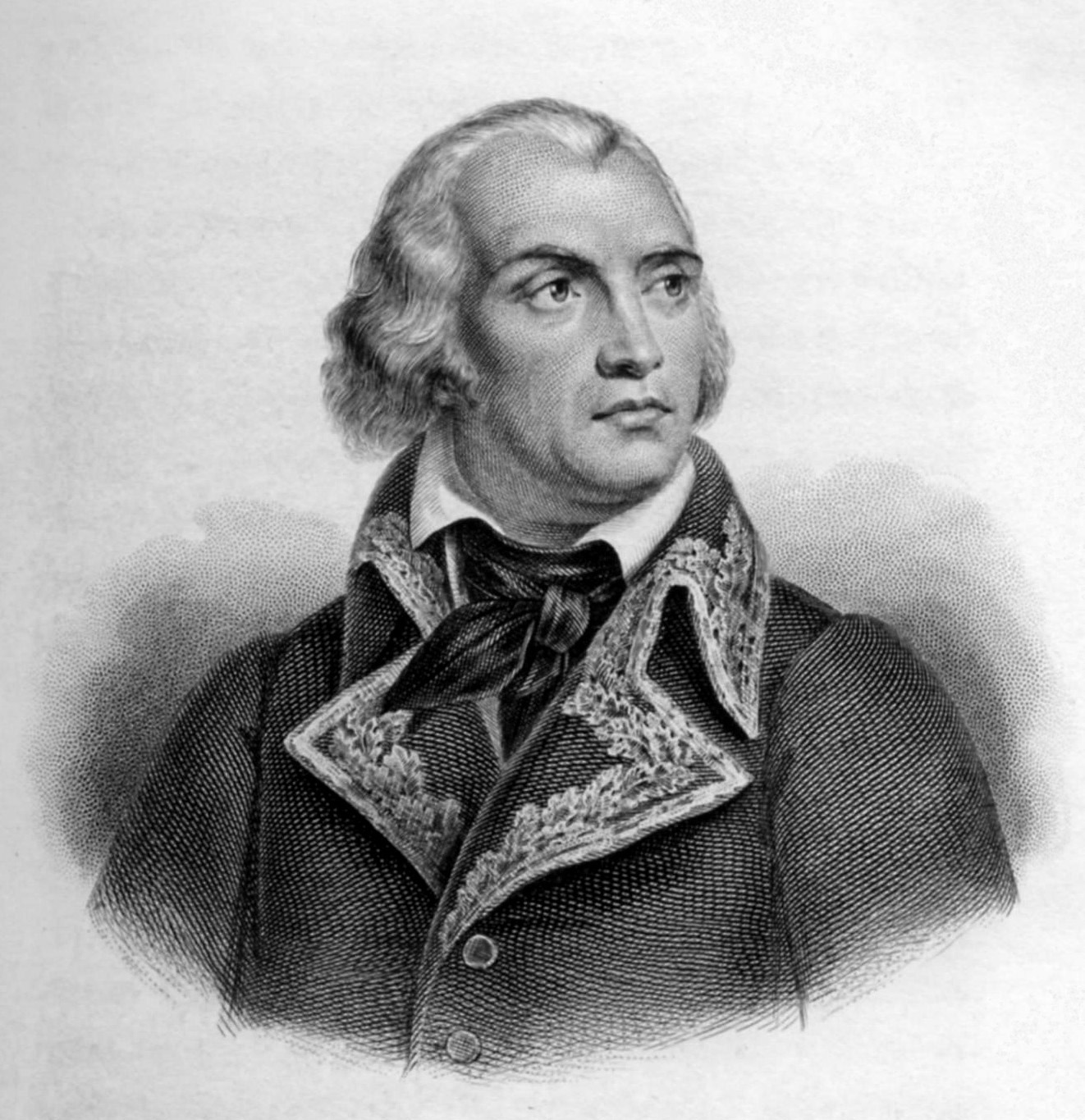
Jean-Charles Pichegru

Pichegru was nominated commander of the Army of the North on 6 January 1794, succeeding Jean-Baptiste Jourdan who was dismissed on 19 January. On 8 February Pichegru arrived at army headquarters to take over from the acting commander Jacques Ferrand. Salme was promoted to general of brigade on 30 March 1794. He had become friends with Pichegru who employed him with the Army of the North. Salme took charge of a brigade in Jacques Philippe Bonnaud's division which fought at the Battle of Tourcoing on 18 May and at the Battle of Tournay on 22 May. For the operations covering the Siege of Ypres Salme's brigade formed part of Éloi Laurent Despeaux's division. When Jean Victor Marie Moreau's troops invested Ypres on 1 June, the divisions of Despeaux on the right, Joseph Souham in the center and Pierre Antoine Michaud on the left provided the screening force. On 10 June the three screening divisions drove off a Coalition corps under François Sébastien Charles Joseph de Croix, Count of Clerfayt from Roeselare (Roulers) after a stiff battle. At 7:00 am on the 13th Clerfayt launched a surprise attack on Despeaux's division, routing Philippe Joseph Malbrancq's brigade and pushing Salme's brigade back toward Menen. The next brigade in line, Jacques MacDonald's of Souham's division resisted Clerfayt's attacks at Hooglede for six hours. At that time, Jan de Winter's brigade arrived to support MacDonald's left and Salme's rallied soldiers moved forward on his right. The tired Coalition soldiers withdrew and Ypres fell on 18 June.

Salme was seriously wounded and his horse killed under him on 13 July at Mechelen (Malines) while fighting along the Leuven Canal. He received credit for the seizure of the town. On 1 September Despeaux's 4th Division consisted of three battalions each of the 38th and 131st Line Infantry Demi-brigades, 3rd Battalion of Tirailleurs, 5th Battalion of Chasseurs, four squadrons of the 19th Cavalry and two squadrons of the 13th Chasseurs à Cheval. Salme replaced Despeaux in command of the division on 20 September. He was ordered to invest the fortress of Grave which his division did on 17 October. Evidently siege artillery was not immediately available because cannons did not start firing at Grave's defenses until 1 December. Salme besieged the place with 3,000 soldiers. The 1,500 Dutch defenders were led by General-major de Bons and included the 2nd Battalion of the Waldeck Infantry Regiment, four companies of the Swiss May Regiment, the depot company of the Hessen-Darmstadt Regiment, 100 men from two Jäger detachments and 100 gunners. Bons surrendered the 160-gun fortress on 29 December after his garrison sustained 16 casualties and eight desertions. Salme reported only 13 casualties.

During the winter of 1794–95 Salme was involved in the invasion of the Dutch Republic. After his troops captured Utrecht on 17 January 1795, Pichegru assigned him the administration of Amsterdam. For three months he and his troops occupied the mansion of Hope & Co. Without unduly antagonizing the city's inhabitants, Salme was able to provide his soldiers with new uniforms and ample food. Next he was ordered to occupy Overijssel province. He helped clear the British forces out of Friesland and Groningen provinces, winning the approval of Souham. Later that year he seems to have served in the Rhine Campaign of 1795 because he was in action at Altenkirchen and became friends with Jean Baptiste Kléber. Meanwhile, government agents stirred up trouble in Belgium with anticlerical activities and other abuses. In June 1796 Salme was assigned to a cavalry command in order to put down rebellions by unhappy Belgians. After running afoul of the French civil authorities of Brussels and the Department of the Dyle, he was recalled by the French Directory on 12 February 1797. In April 1797, the commander of the Army of Sambre-et-Meuse, Lazare Hoche named Salme to command a dragoon brigade in Louis Klein's division. When Michel Ney was captured on 21 April, Salme succeeded to command of the Hussar Division, but an armistice ended the fighting two days later.

== War of the Second Coalition ==
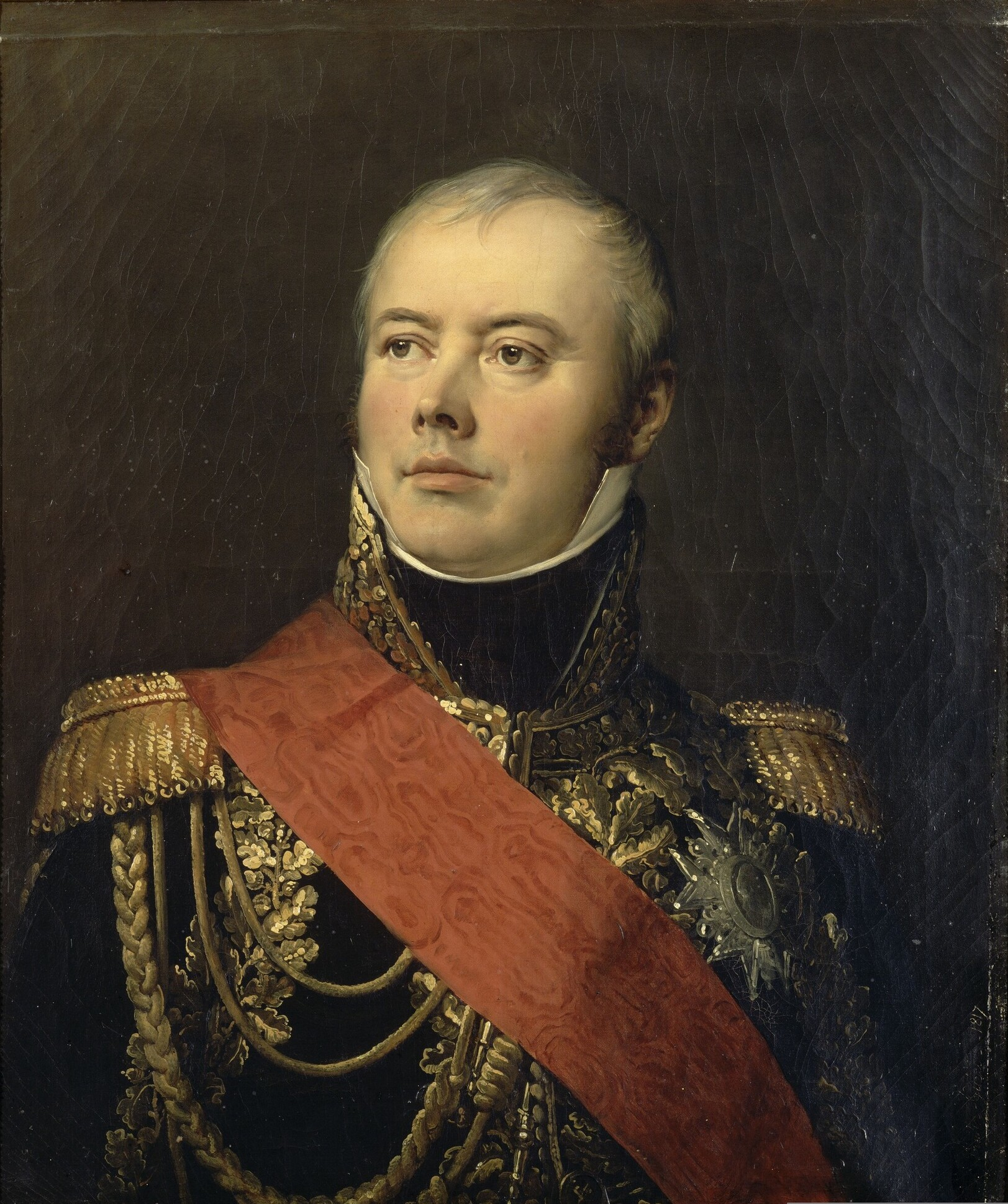
Jacques MacDonald

The Coup of 18 Fructidor occurred on 4 September 1797 when the Royalist faction was overthrown by force. The treason of Pichegru came to light at this time and he was exiled from France. Because of his well-known friendship with the traitor, Salme was denounced by Hoche as "Pichegru's vile spy" and dismissed from the army. After over a year of forced retirement, he secured a post with the Army of Egypt on 9 November 1798 due to the intervention of Kléber. However, Salme missed the sailing at Ancona and instead joined the Army of Rome under Jean Étienne Championnet. At that time Guillaume Philibert Duhesme's division of 3,000–4,000 men was near Ancona. In the face of an attack by the Neapolitan army, Championnet evacuated Rome on 27 November. However, the Neapolitan army quickly unraveled and the French recaptured Rome on 15 December and seized Naples itself on 23 January 1799. Soon after, Championnet got into a dispute with French government agents, was removed from command on 28 February and placed under arrest. MacDonald replaced him as commander of the army.

In view of the French defeats in northern Italy, MacDonald was instructed to garrison central and southern Italy and come north by forced marches with the Army of Naples. The order arrived on 14 April 1799 and MacDonald began his move north on 7 May. MacDonald named Salme to lead the 2,997-man army Advance Guard which was made up of the 15th Light (1,390 men) and 11th Line (1,440 men) Infantry Demi-brigades, 94 troopers from the 25th Chasseurs à Cheval and 53 gunners and sappers. At 8:00 am on 17 June 1799, MacDonald opened the Battle of Trebbia by sending 18,700 soldiers from the divisions of Claude Perrin Victor, Jean-Baptiste Dominique Rusca and Jean Henri Dombrowski plus Salme's Advance Guard into action. At first the French pressed back the Austrians of Peter Karl Ott von Bátorkéz but reinforcements began to arrive until the Coalition commander Alexander Suvorov had 30,656 Austrians and Russians on the field. MacDonald had been wounded at the Battle of Modena and delegated Victor to direct the assault. But Victor never took charge of the troops that day and the French fought without a guiding hand. Late in the day, Salme's Advance Guard covered the retreat of the three French divisions behind the Tidone River.

Salme's troops were only Frenchmen that remained east of the Trebbia River. On 18 June MacDonald waited for his three missing divisions to arrive on the battlefield. Meanwhile, Suvorov planned to launch a powerful stroke with his right wing but was unable to get his columns moving. It was so quiet that Salme asked permission to go into Piacenza. The Coalition assault began at 4:00 pm and struck Salme first. He was ordered to retreat as soon as the enemy applied pressure but instead he stood his ground. Salme was wounded and so was his successor Jean Sarrazin. Finally Louis Joseph Lahure took command and withdrew the Advance Guard behind the Trebbia, but not without some confusion. When the Army of Naples retreated on 20 June it left behind wounded generals Salme, Rusca and Jean-Baptiste Olivier. Salme was held a prisoner by the Austrians until the Treaty of Lunéville in March 1801.

== Saint-Domingue and career eclipse ==
Salme went on the Saint-Domingue expedition arriving in Hispaniola on 5 February 1802. He was assigned to command the 13th Brigade in Jean Hardy's division. The expedition commander Charles Leclerc immediately organized a sweep to round up Haitian forces led by Toussaint Louverture. During the operation, Hardy took Salme's brigade on an all-night march to surprise a Haitian base at Bayonnais. Much of Haiti was brought under French control but large Haitian forces escaped and Hardy's division returned to Cap-Français. Leclerc promoted Salme general of division on 15 May 1802 and immediately set him back to France for reasons which remain unclear. The possibilities are that he was sick, that he was harshly critical of restoring slavery in Hispaniola, that he was dealing in the black market and, finally, that he had become the lover of Pauline Bonaparte, Leclerc's wife. In any case he was directed to report on the condition of the army when he got back to France. That year Leclerc and Hardy and most of the army perished from yellow fever.

On 16 October 1802 Salme was placed in inactive status and given an annual pension of 5,000 francs. On 26 August 1803 he was retired with a pension of 2,500 francs. He took up residence in Drusenheim on a property co-owned by his father-in-law. His wife Jeanne Henriette tried to poison him but a loyal servant warned him in time and the only fatality was his dog. He moved to the market square of Neufchâteau and went into business with another man as manufacturers of starch. Because of his association with Moreau the police had him under surveillance in June 1804. He sent many letters to the War Ministry asking to be employed but he was ignored even though he had the sympathy of Pierre de Ruel, marquis de Beurnonville. Much of his time was taken up by a property dispute with his wife. On 8 August 1809 he was given command of a brigade of National Guards and served in the Walcheren Campaign. Though he performed his duties properly, he was sent home on 29 September 1809.

== Tarragona and death ==
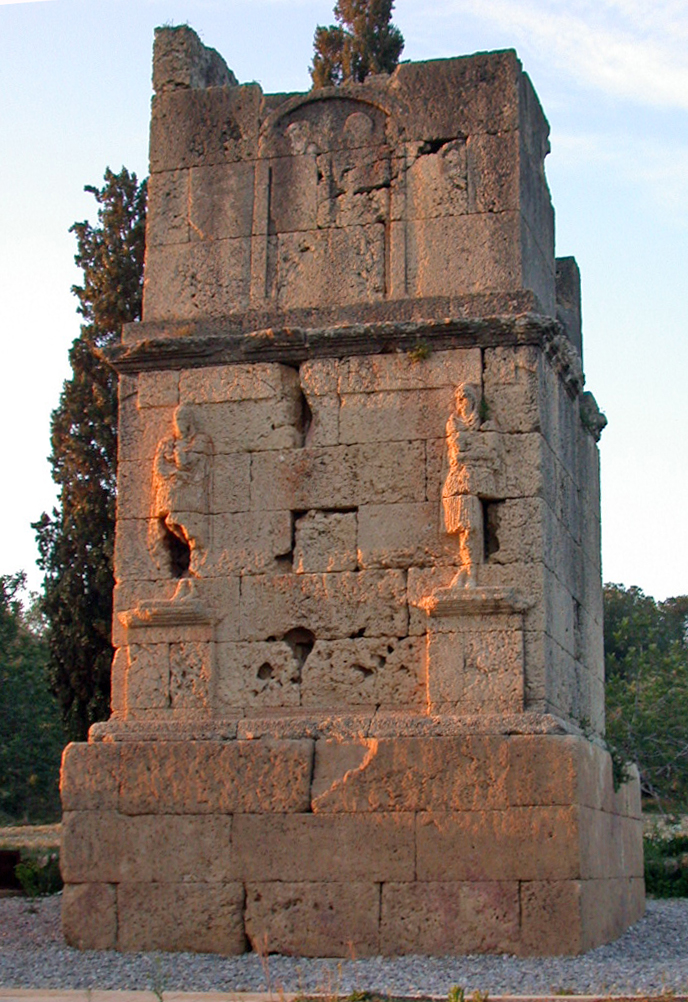
Tower of the Scipios

Souham was home from the Peninsular War with a wound and Salme asked that general to get him a combat posting. On 16 April 1810 he was appointed to the VII Corps also known as the Army of Catalonia. At that time Louis-Gabriel Suchet was getting ready to besiege Tortosa with his III Corps. MacDonald's VII Corps was supposed to support Suchet's operation by threatening Tarragona in August 1810. On 14 September, the Spanish under Henry O'Donnell wiped out one of MacDonald's brigades in a successful raid at the Battle of La Bisbal well to the north. As the Spanish column, without O'Donnell who had been wounded, passed near MacDonald the French general moved against it. On 21 October 1810, an Italian brigade under Francesco Orsatelli Eugenio supported by a French brigade under Salme attacked the Spanish position at Cardona. Eugenio's reckless initial assault was repulsed with 100 casualties and MacDonald withdrew.

Emperor Napoleon directed Suchet to capture the port city of Tarragona and promised that general that he would find his marshal's baton inside its walls. Unhappy with the operations of MacDonald, the emperor boosted Suchet's army from 26,000 to 43,000 troops by transferring soldiers from MacDonald's VII Corps in March 1811. After detaching 20 battalions as garrisons and observation forces, Suchet assembled 29 battalions for his siege force. These were grouped into infantry divisions under Jean Isidore Harispe, Bernard-Georges-François Frère and Pierre-Joseph Habert and 1,400 cavalry led by André Joseph Boussart. There were also 2,000 gunners and 750 engineers and sappers attached to the army. Harispe and Frère marched from Lleida (Lérida) while Habert moved from Tortosa along the coast with the siege train. Harispe's division occupied Montblanc on 29 April 1811 and Reus on 2 May. Leading the inland column, Salme's advanced guard pushed the Spanish outposts behind the Francolí River on 3 May. Salme became a member of the Légion d'Honneur on 7 May 1811.

North of Tarragona lay Monte Olivo which overlooked the lower town. Atop the feature, the Spanish defenders built the powerful Fort Olivo, protected by a ditch carved into solid rock and defended by 1,000 soldiers. Suchet and his engineers determined to start the Siege of Tarragona from the west side, but first they needed to capture Fort Olivo from which the Spanish could take the siege trenches under a crossfire. Suchet arranged his divisions with Habert on the right at the coast, Frère in the center straddling the Francolí and Harispe on the left. In Harispe's division Salme's French brigade faced Fort Olivo while the two Italian brigades reached around to touch the coast east of Tarragona. Harispe's division included three battalions each of the 7th and 16th Line Infantry Regiments and eight Italian battalions. On 13 May the French captured two small fortifications in front of Fort Olivo and beat back a three-battalion counterattack by the Spanish the next day. Because the main attack from the west was delayed, Suchet decided to concentrate a vigorous effort against Fort Olivo beginning on 23 May. Over the next few days batteries before the fort were armed with 13 cannons which began to inflict serious damage on it. On the night of 27 May, as French soldiers dragged four 24-pound cannons into battery, they were blasted by Spanish fire which caused numerous casualties. At this moment, the defenders mounted a sortie from Fort Olivo. Watching the proceedings carefully, Salme called out to his reserves, "Brave 7th forward!" He was struck in the head by a musket ball and killed instantly. The men rushed past him and repulsed the Spanish attack. Fort Olivo fell on the night of the 29th with heavy losses to the defenders.

Salme was buried under a nearby aqueduct, the Pont de les Ferreres, and his embalmed heart was placed in the Tower of the Scipios along the road to Barcelona. After the French captured Tarragona they changed the name of Fort Olivo to Fort Salme. Since Salme had no children and was in the process of divorcing his wife, his financial assets were distributed among his brothers and sisters. Napoleon granted his father a 1,000 franc per year annuity. SALM is engraved on the west side of the Arc de Triomphe.
