= Avillers-Sainte-Croix =

- Commune
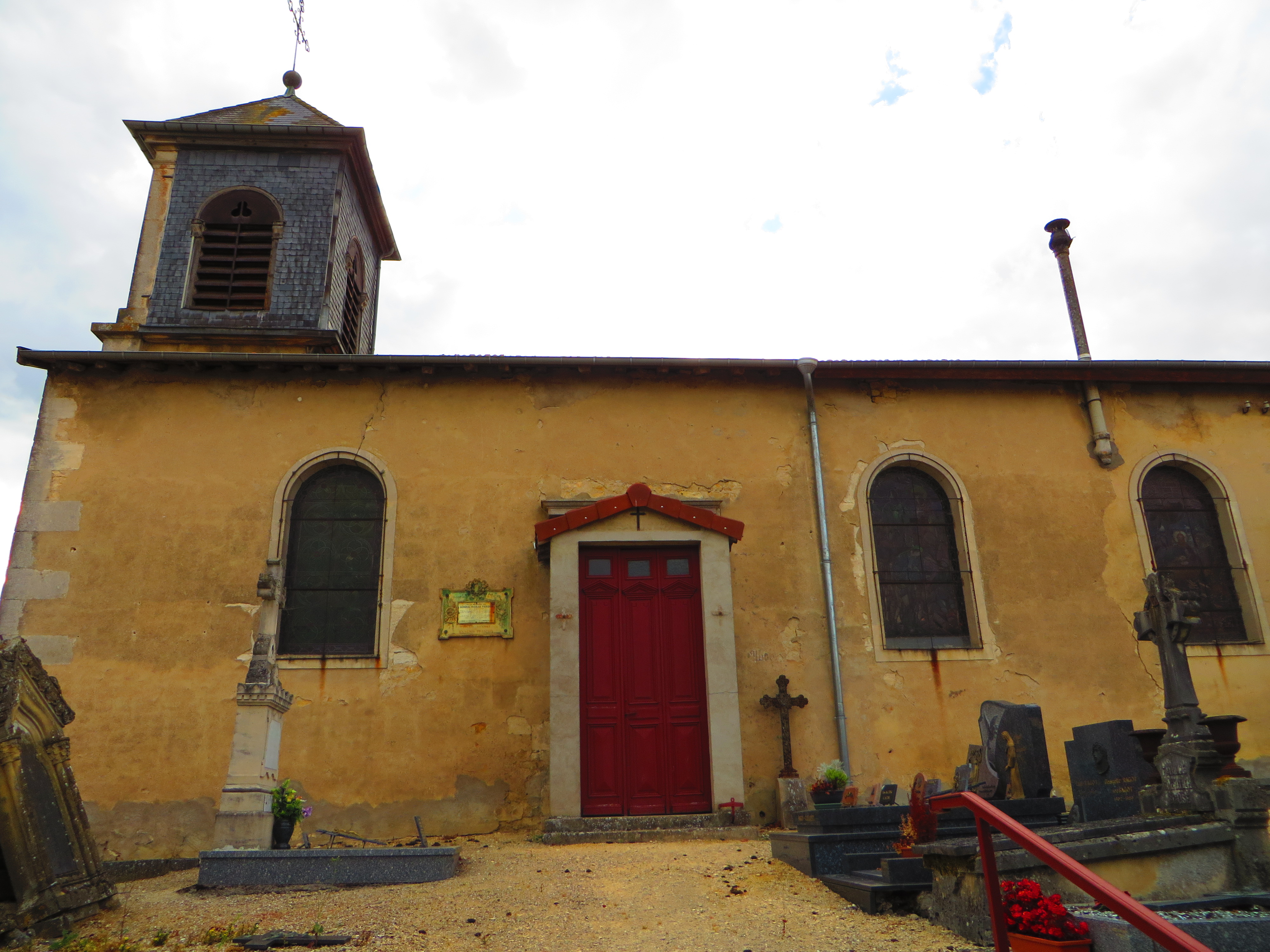
- The church in Avillers-Sainte-Croix
- Location of Avillers-Sainte-Croix
- Location within France Location within Grand Est
- Coordinates: 49°01′57″N 5°42′02″E
- Country: France
- Region: Grand Est
- Department: Meuse
- Arrondissement: Verdun
- Canton: Étain
- Intercommunality: CC Territoire Fresnes-en-Woëvre

Government
  - Mayor (2020–2026): François Jamin
- Area^{1}: 5.5 km^{2} (2.1 sq mi)
- Elevation: 203 m (666 ft)
- Highest elevation: 239 m (784 ft)
- Lowest elevation: 212 m (696 ft)
- Population (2023): 80
  - Density: 15/km^{2} (38/sq mi)
- Time zone: UTC+01:00 (CET)
  - Summer (DST): UTC+02:00 (CEST)
- INSEE/Postal code: 55021 /55210
- ^{1} French Land Register data, which excludes lakes, ponds, glaciers > 1 km^{2} (0.386 sq mi or 247 acres) and river estuaries.

Avillers-Sainte-Croix is a commune in the Meuse department in the Grand Est region in northeastern France.

== Population ==
Historical population
Year	Pop.	±% p.a.
1968	78	—
1975	65	−2.57%
1982	57	−1.86%
1990	66	+1.85%
1999	70	+0.66%
2007	60	−1.91%
2012	65	+1.61%
2017	61	−1.26%
2023	80	+4.62%
Source: INSEE

== See also ==
- Communes of the Meuse department
