= Italian name =

A name in the Italian language consists of a given name (Italian: nome) and a surname (cognome); in most contexts, the given name is written before the surname, although in official documents, the surname may be written before the given name or names.

Italian names, with their fixed nome and cognome structure, differ from the ancient Roman naming conventions, which used a tripartite system of given name, gentile name, and hereditary or personal name (or names).

The Italian nome is not analogous to the ancient Roman nomen; the Italian nome is the given name (distinct between siblings), while the Roman nomen is the gentile name (inherited, thus shared by all in a gens). Female naming traditions, and name-changing rules after adoption for both sexes, likewise differ between Roman antiquity and modern Italian use. Moreover, the low number, and the steady decline of importance and variety, of Roman praenomina starkly contrast with the current number of Italian given names.

In Southern Italy, one portion in a person's name may be determined by the name day (onomastico). These name days are determined according to the sanctorale, a cycle found in the General Roman Calendar, which assigns to a day a saint, or as to the great majority of days, several saints, so that different names are often celebrated on that day. Traditionally, parents fix the name day of their child at christening, according to their favourite saint. In the case of multiple given names, the child will celebrate only one, usually the first.

== Given names ==
Typical Italian male given names:

- Commonly end in -o: Alberto, Aldo, Alessio, Alessandro, Amedeo, Angelo, Antonio, Bernardo, Brando, Bruno, Carlo, Claudio, Cosimo, Cristiano, Damiano, Danilo, Dario, Domenico, Duccio, Edoardo, Elio, Emilio, Enrico, Eugenio, Fabio, Fabrizio, Federico, Ferdinando, Filippo, Flavio, Francesco, Franco, Fulvio, Giacomo, Giorgio, Giuliano, Giulio, Gregorio, Guglielmo, Guido, Jacopo, Lapo, Leandro, Leonardo, Lorenzo, Loriano, Luciano, Lucio, Ludovico, Marcello, Marco, Mario, Martino, Massimiliano, Massimo, Matteo, Maurizio, Mauro, Michelangelo, Milo, Mirco, Niccolò, Nico, Olmo, Orazio, Orlando, Ottavio, Paolo, Piero, Pietro, Raffaello, Riccardo, Roberto, Romolo, Sandro, Saverio, Silvio, Stefano, Tiberio, Tito, Tiziano, Tommaso, Umberto, Valentino, Valerio, Vincenzo, Vittorio, Zeno, etc.
- Can also end in -e: Achille, Cesare, Daniele, Dante, Davide, Emanuele, Ettore, Gabriele, Gioele, Giuseppe, Leone, Michele, Paride, Raffaele, Salvatore, Samuele, Simone, etc.
- May also end in -i: Gianni, Giovanni, Luigi, Manfredi, Neri, Ranieri, Tancredi, Vieri, etc.
- Or in -a: Andrea, Elia, Enea, Luca, Mattia, Nicola, Tobia
- Some names, usually of foreign origin (or foreign variant of existing Italian names), end with a consonant, such as Christian/Cristian (cf. Cristiano), Eros, Igor, Ivan (cf. Ivano or Giovanni), Loris, Oscar and Walter/Valter (cf. Gualtiero).

Typical Italian female names:

- Commonly end in -a: Ada, Adriana, Agata, Allegra, Alba, Alessandra, Alessia, Alma, Amanda, Ambra, Amelia, Angela, Angelica, Anita, Anna, Antonella, Arianna, Aurelia, Aurora, Azzurra, Benedetta, Bianca, Camilla, Carla, Carlotta, Carola, Carolina, Caterina, Catia, Cecilia, Chiara, Cinzia, Clara, Clarissa, Claudia, Clelia, Clizia, Cora, Corinna, Cristiana, Cristina, Daniela, Delia, Diana, Domitilla, Elena, Elisa, Elisabetta, Eleonora, Elettra, Elsa, Emanuela, Emilia, Emma, Erica, Eugenia, Eva, Federica, Fiorella, Flaminia, Flavia, Francesca, Fulvia, Gabriella, Gaia, Giada, Gianna, Ginevra, Giorgia, Giovanna, Giuditta, Giulia, Giuliana, Greta, Ilaria, Iolanda, Isabella, Iva, Lara, Larissa, Laura, Lavinia, Letizia, Libera, Lidia, Liliana, Linda, Lisa, Livia, Lucia, Lucrezia, Ludovica, Luisa, Maddalena, Manuela, Mara, Marcella, Margherita, Maria, Marianna, Marina, Marta, Martina, Marzia, Michela, Mina, Monica, Nadia, Nicoletta, Nora, Ofelia, Olimpia, Olivia, Ottavia, Paola, Patrizia, Raffaella, Rebecca, Rita, Roberta, Rosa, Sabrina, Samanta, Sandra, Sara, Serena, Silvia, Sofia, Sonia, Stefania, Stella, Susanna, Sveva, Tatiana, Teresa, Tosca, Valentina, Valeria, Vanessa, Veronica, Viola, Virginia, Virna, Vittoria, Viviana, etc.
- Can also end in -e: Adelaide, Adele, Agnese, Alice, Beatrice, Cloe, Iole, Irene, Luce, Matilde, Rachele, Sole, Violante, Zoe, etc.
- May also end in -i: Edi, Noemi, etc.
- Or even with a consonant (usually of foreign origin), such as Ester, Ines, Iris, Micol, Miriam, etc.

A few names end with an accented vowel, for instance Niccolò.

Almost every base name can have a diminutive form ending with -ino/-ina, as in Carolina from Carola, Martina from Marta, or -etto/etta, or -ello/-ella. Diminutive forms can vary depending on the dialect.

The most common names are:

- For males: Marco, Alessandro, Luca, Giovanni, Giuseppe, Roberto, Andrea, Stefano, Angelo, Francesco, Mario, Luigi.
- For females: Anna, Maria, Sara, Laura, Aurora, Valentina, Giulia, Gianna, Angela, Giovanna, Sofia, Stella.

Since the ancient Romans had a very limited stock of given names (praenomina), very few modern Italian given names (nomi) are derived directly from the classical ones. A rare example would be Marco (from Marcus).

Some nomi were taken from classical clan names (nomina) for their meanings or because they are euphonic, such as Emilio/Emilia (from Aemilius), Valerio/Valeria (from Valerius), Claudio/Claudia (from Claudius), Orazio (from Horatius), Fabio (from the cognomen Fabius), Flavio/Flavia (from Flavius).

When combined with a second given name, Giovanni and Pietro are commonly contracted to Gian- and Pier-, as in Giancarlo, Gianfranco, Gianluca, Gianluigi, Gianmarco, Giampaolo (Gianpaolo), Giampiero (Gianpiero), Pierfrancesco, Piergiorgio, Pierluigi, Pierpaolo, and so on.

Italian unisex names are very rare (e.g. Celeste), but the feminine name Maria can be used as a masculine second name, as in Carlo Maria.

== Surnames ==
Italy has the largest collection of surnames (cognomi) of any country in the world, with over 350,000. Men—except slaves—in ancient Rome always had hereditary surnames, i.e., nomen (clan name) and cognomen (side-clan name). However, the multi-name tradition was lost by the Middle Ages. Outside the aristocracy, where surnames were often patronymic or those of manors or fiefs, most Italians began to assume hereditary surnames around 1450.

Registration of baptisms and marriages became mandatory in parishes after the Council of Trent in 1564.

=== Suffixes ===
A large number of Italian surnames end in i due to the medieval Italian habit of identifying families by the name of the ancestors in the plural (which has an -i suffix in Italian). For instance, Filippo from the Ormanno family (gli Ormanni) would be called "Filippo degli Ormanni" ("Filippo of the Ormannos"). In time, the middle possessive portion ("of the") was dropped, but surnames became permanently pluralized even for a single person. Filippo Ormanno would therefore be known as Filippo Ormanni. Some families, however, opted to retain the possessive portion of their surnames, for instance Lorenzo de' Medici literally means "Lorenzo of the Medici" (de' is a contraction of dei, also meaning "of the"; cf. The Medicis). Another example of the use of plural suffix in Italian surnames is Manieri which is the plural form of Mainiero.

Some common suffixes indicate endearment (which may also become pluralized and receive an -i ending), for example:

- -ello/etto/ino (diminutive "little"), e.g., Morelli, Ferretti, Bellini
- -one (augmentative "big"), e.g., Marconi
- -accio/azzo/asso (pejorative), e.g., Boccacci

Other endings are characteristic of certain regions:

- Veneto: -asso, -ato/ati, and consonants (l, n, r); -on: Bissacco, Zoccarato, Cavinato, Brombal, Bordin, Meneghin, Perin, Vazzoler, Peron, Francescon, Zanon, Fanton
- Sicily: -aro, -isi and -osso: Cavallaro, Torrisi, Rosso (Sicily, Piedmont and Veneto)
- Lombardy and Piedmont: -ago/ghi (of Celtic derivation), -engo/enghi (of Germanic derivation): Salmoiraghi, Ornaghi, Martinengo, Giordanengo, Lambertenghi
- Lombardy: -ate/ati/atti: Lunati, Bonatti, Moratti, Orsatti
- Piedmont: -ero, -audi, -asco,-zzi, -ini: Ferrero, Rambaudi, Bonazzi, Baldovini
- Friuli: -otti/utti and -t: Bortolotti, Pascutti, Codutti, Rigonat, Ret
- Tuscany: -ai, -ini, -ucci: Niccolai, Puccini, Vannucci
- Sardinia: -u, -as and -is, derived from the Sardinian language (see Sardinian surnames): Cadeddu, Schirru, Marras, Argiolas, Floris, Melis, Abis, Cannas
- Calabria: -ace: Versace
- Campania: -iello: Borriello, Aiello, Manganiello
- Abruzzo: -us, -is and -iis that stem from traditional Latin names: Fidelibus, De Sanctis, De Laurentiis

=== Origins ===
As in most other European naming traditions, patronymics are common. Originally they were indicated by a possessive, e.g., Francesco de Bernardo, meaning "Francis (the son) of Bernard". De Luca ("[son] of Luke") remains one of the most common Italian surnames. However, de ("of") was often dropped and suffixes added, hence de Bernardo evolved to be Bernardo and eventually pluralized as Bernardi (see Suffixes above).

The origin or residence of the family gave rise to many surnames, e.g.:

- Habitat: Boschi/Bosco ("woods/wood"), Valle ("valley")
- Specific placename:
  - Abruzzi/Abruzzese/Abruzzesi/D'Abruzzo ("from Abruzzo")
  - Bergamaschi/Bergamelli/Bergami/Bergamin/Bergamini/Bergamo ("from Bergamo")
  - Bologna/Bologni/Bolognese/Bolognesi ("from Bologna")
  - Bresci/(De) Brescia/Bresciani/Bresciano/Brescianini ("Brescian"/"from Brescia")
  - Calabrese/Calabresi/Calabria ("Calabrian"/"from Calabria")
  - Catalani/Catalano ("Catalan")
  - Catanese/Catanesi/Catania ("Catanian"/"from Catania")
  - Comaschi/Comasco/Comencini/Comi/Comin/Comini/Cominotto/Comis/Comisso/Dacomi/Da Como/Dacomo ("from Como”)
  - Danese/Danesi ("Danish")
  - Emiliani/Emiliano ("Emilian"/"from Emilia")
  - Fiorentini/Fiorentino/Firenze/Florenzi ("Florentine"/"from Florence")
  - Francese/Francesi/Franzese/Franzesi ("French")
  - Furlan/Furlani ("from Friuli")
  - Inglese/Inglesi ("English")
  - De Genova/Di Genova/Genova/Genovese/Genovesi ("Genoese"/"from Genoa")
  - Greco ("Greek")
  - Lodes/Lodesani/Lodetti/Lodi/Lodigiani ("from Lodi")
  - De Lucca/Di Lucca/Lucca/Lucchesi/Lucchese ("from Lucca")
  - Maltese/Maltesi ("from Malta")
  - De Milano/Di Milano/Milano/Milanese/Milanesi ("Milanese"/"from Milan")
  - De Napoli/Di Napoli/Napoli/Napoletani/Napoletano/Napolitani/Napolitano ("Neapolitan"/"from Naples")
  - Da Padova/Di Padova/Padova/Padovani/Padovano/Patavini/Patavino/Padovan ("Paduan"/"from Padua")
  - (Di) Palermo/Palermitani/Palermitano ("Palermitan"/"from Palermo")
  - Parigi/Parisi ("from Paris")
  - Pavese/PavesiPavia ("from Pavia")
  - Perugini ("from Perugia")
  - De Pisa/Di Pisa/Pisa/Pisani/Pisano ("Pisan"/"from Pisa")
  - Portoghese/Portoghesi ("Portuguese")
  - Puglisi/Pugliese ("Apulian"/"from Apulia")
  - Romagnoli/Romagnolo ("from Romagna")
  - Romani/Romano ("Roman"/"from Rome")
  - Salerno/Salernitani/Salernitano ("Salernitan"/"from Salerno")
  - Sardo ("Sardinian"/"from Sardinia")
  - Senesi ("from Siena")
  - Siciliani/Siciliano ("Sicilian"/"from Sicily")
  - Spagnoli/Spagnolo/Spagnuolo ("Spaniard", "Spanish")
  - Svizzero ("Swiss")
  - Tedeschi/Tedesco/Tedisco/Todeschi/Todesco ("German")
  - Toscani/Toscano ("Tuscan"/"from Tuscany")
  - Trentin/Trentini ("from Trento")
  - Trevisan/Trevisani ("from Treviso")
  - Umbri/Umbro ("Umbrian"/"from Umbria")
  - Veneziani/Veneziano ("Venetian"/"from Venice")
  - Veronese/Veronesi ("from Verona")
  - Visentin/Visentini ("from Vicenza")
- Nearby landmarks: Della Rovere ("of the oak tree"), Fontana ("fountain"), Castelli ("castles")

Ancestors' occupation was also a great source of surnames:

- Job title: Cattaneo ("captain"), Conti ("counts"), Maestri ("teachers")
- Objects (metonyms) associated with the vocation: Ferrari ("iron", blacksmith)

Nicknames, referring to physical attributes or mannerism, also gave rise to some family names, e.g., Rossi ("redhead") and Mancini ("left-handed").

Another common category is surnames given to abandoned children and foundlings: Casadei ("house of God"), Colombo ("dove"), Di Dio ("of God"), Esposito ("exposed"), Innocenti ("innocent"), Proietti ("cast away"), Sperandio ("hope in God"), Trovati ("found"), Venturini (related to "venture"). Umberto Eco and Franco Zeffirelli's surnames also are foundling names.

A few family names are still in the original Latin, like De Amicis and Ferraris, reflecting that the family name has been preserved from Medieval Latin sources as a part of their business or household documentation or church records.

=== Second surnames ===
In some areas of Italy, individuals and their descendants may have taken a second surname, attached to the first by the word detto, vulgo, or dit (all meaning “called” or “known as”). This practice was mostly used to distinguish between different branches of the same family, especially when the families remained in the same town for generations.

Occasionally, a very similar name to the one already used by the family was adopted in order to better parallel local naming styles. For example, when they settled and founded their firm in France, the Mellerio family of jewellers, from Valle Vigezzo, modified their name to Mellerio dits Meller.

Some families with such names eventually drop the first part or even in rare cases the second, as with the Mellerio family (the expanded form of whose name now survives only in the name of their company).

== Articles ==
The traditional rule, which is the common usage, especially in Tuscany, is that in referring to people by their surnames alone, the definite article should be used (il for most parts, lo before some consonants and consonant clusters and l' before vowels). Mario Rossi, therefore, is called il Rossi ("the Rossi"). Now, some prefer to use the article only or chiefly for historical surnames ("l'Ariosto", "il Manzoni", etc.)

Male given names are never preceded by an article except in popular northern regional usage.

However, in Tuscany and the rest of Northern Italy, given names of females are usually preceded by articles (la Giulia) unless one is speaking of a woman who is personally unknown (such as Cleopatra, Maria Stuarda, with no article). That is also the traditional grammar rule.

Articles are also used (more often than with those of men) with the surnames of women: Gianni Rossi can be called il Rossi or (especially nowadays) simply Rossi, but Giulia Bianchi is usually la Bianchi (also la Giulia Bianchi).

Names that are derived from possessions of noble families normally never had articles preceding them such as the House of Farnese (from a territorial holding) and the Cornaro family (from a prince-bishopric). Articles were also omitted for surnames with an identifiable foreign origin (including Latin ones) such as Cicerone.

That practice somewhat resembles the Greek custom of placing definite articles before all names (see Greek names). The practice even spread to French in the 17th century, especially in writings regarding figures in literature and painting such as le Poussin.

== See also ==
- Surnames by country § Italy
- List of most common surnames in Europe § Italy
- Germanic names in Italy
