= Fulvia (disambiguation) =

Fulvia, an ancient Latin woman's name, may refer to:

== People ==
- People from the ancient Roman Fulvia gens
- Fulvia, a 1st-century BCE Roman woman noted for her political ambitions
- Fulvia Célica, Peruvian transsexual woman
- Fulvia Miani Perotti (1844-1931), Italian writer
- Fulvia Michela Caligiuri (born 1973), Italian politician
- Fulvia (mistress of Quintus Curius), Roman noblewoman who revealed the Catilinarian conspiracy to Cicero
- Fulvia Plautilla, a Roman princess
- Fulvia (Wife of Saturninus)
- Olympia Fulvia Morata, a 16th-century Italian scholar

== Other ==
- Fulvia (bivalve), a genus of cockles
- Fulvia (Phrygia), a town of ancient Phrygia, now in Turkey
- Fulvia (book), 2025 non-fiction book by Jane Draycott
- 609 Fulvia, an asteroid
- Basilica Fulvia, an ancient basilica
- Lancia Fulvia, a car
- MS Fulvia, a Costa Cruises ship (formerly the MS Oslofjord (1949), that was destroyed by fire in 1970
