= Ducci =

Ducci (pronounced [ˈduttʃi]) is an Italian surname. Notable people with the surname include:

- Brunetto Bucciarelli-Ducci (1914–1994), Italian politician and magistrate
- Chiara Bucciarelli-Ducci (born 1976), Italian cardiologist
- Filippa Ducci (1520–1586), Italian-French noblewoman and mistress of Henry II
- Jackie Ducci, American philanthropist, dressage rider and author
- Luciano Ducci (born 1955), Brazilian doctor and politician
- Sara Ducci (born 1971), Italian physicist
- Varrone Ducci (1898–1945), Italian politician, landowner and lawyer
- Virgilio Ducci (1623–?), Italian painter

== See also ==
- Ducci sequence
- Duccio (disambiguation)
