= Flavia (given name) =

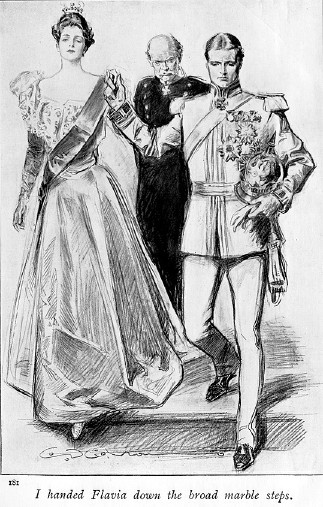
- The Ancient Roman name Flavia was used for Princess Flavia in The Prisoner of Zenda.
- Pronunciation: FLAH-vee-ah or FLAY-vee-ah
- Gender: Female

Origin
- Origin: Ancient Roman
- Meaning: golden, blonde; from Latin
- Region of origin: Italy, France, Brazil, Romania, Spain and other Spanish-speaking countries

Other names
- Related names: Flaviana, Flavie, Flavy, Flaviere, Flavyere

Flavia is a feminine given name of Latin origin. The name is most commonly used in Brazil, Italy, Portugal Romania, and in Spanish-speaking countries. It is in occasional use in the United States, where 18 newborn girls were given the name in 2022.

== Origin ==
Originating from the Latin word "flavus", meaning "golden" or "blonde", Flavia became an Ancient Roman nomen gentilicium for women of the gens Flavia. This gens gave rise to two imperial dynasties, the Flavian dynasty of the 1st-century and the Constantinian dynasty of the 2nd and 3rd-centuries, their use of the name (and its masculine counterpart Flavius) helped spread its popularity in the ancient world. As a nomen Flavia is the name of Roman Catholic and Eastern Orthodox saints: Flavia Domitilla, wife of Clemens, Flavia Domitilla and Flavia.

== Notable people ==
- Flavia Arcaro (1876–1937), American actress
- Flavia Bujor (born 1988), Romanian-born French novelist
- Flavia Cacace (born 1980), Italian dancer
- Flavia DeBrito, American politician
- Flavia Eberhard (born 1976), Brazilian free-diver
- Flavia Fortunato (born 1964), Italian singer, actress, and television presenter
- Flavia Seia Isaurica (fl. 140s), ancient Roman businesswoman
- Flavia Lötscher (born 2004), Swiss rower
- Flavia Lüscher (born 2003), Swiss footballer
- Flávia de Oliveira (born 1983), Brazilian model
- Flavia Pansieri (born 1951), Italian former United Nations Deputy High Commissioner for Human Rights, Assistant Secretary-General
- Flavia Pennetta (born 1982), Italian tennis player
- Flávia Saddy (born 1978), Brazilian voice actress.
- Flávia Saraiva (born 1999), Brazilian artistic gymnast
- Flavia Schwarz (born 1986), Swiss footballer
- Flavia Tata Nardini, Italian aerospace engineer and entrepreneur based in South Australia
- Flavia Tartaglini (born 1985), Italian sports sailor
- Flavia Tumusiime (born 1989), Ugandan actress, model, radio, and television personality

== Notable people with the spelling "Flavie" ==
- Flavie Aumond, Canadian freestyle skier
- Flavie Flament, French television and radio presenter
- Flavie Van den Hende, Belgian cello player
- Flavie Lemaître (born 1988), French footballer
- Flavie Renouard (born 2000), French steeplechase runner

=== As a surname ===
- Oyié Flavié (born 1973), Cameroonian footballer

== Fictional characters ==
- Flavia Brent, a character in the play Noises Off
- Flavia Gemina, a character in The Roman Mysteries
- Princess Flavia, a character in The Prisoner of Zenda and its sequel Rupert of Hentzau
- Flavia de Luce, a character in the Alan Bradley mystery series
- Flavia, a character from the Latin textbook Ecce Romani

== Buildings ==
- Porto Flavia
