= Caligiuri =

Caligiuri is an Italian surname. Notable people with the surname include:

- Daniel Caligiuri (born 1988), German-Italian footballer (soccer player)
- Fred Caligiuri (1918–2018), American baseball player
- Fulvia Michela Caligiuri (born 1973), Italian politician
- Marco Caligiuri (born 1984), German-Italian footballer (soccer player)
- Michael A. Caligiuri (born 1956), American physician scientist focused on oncology and immunology
- Paul Caligiuri (born 1964), American footballer (soccer player)
- Paula Caligiuri, American academic, talent management specialist, psychologist, book author, and entrepreneur
- Sam Caligiuri (born 1966), American politician

== See also ==
- 42365 Caligiuri, a main-belt asteroid
- Richard Caliguiri (1931–1988), American politician
