= Antonio Catalani =

Antonio Catalani may refer to:

- Antonio Catalani (Romano) (c. 1596–1666), also called il Romano, Italian painter of the late-Renaissance and early-Baroque periods
- Antonio Catalani (Siciliano) (1560–1630), also called il Siciliano, Italian painter of the late-Renaissance and early-Baroque periods
