= Abruzzo (surname) =

Abruzzo is an Italian surname. Notable people with the surname include:

- Ben Abruzzo (1930-1985), American balloonist
- Jennifer Abruzzo, American labor lawyer and General Counsel of the National Labor Relations Board (NLRB)
- Joseph Abruzzo (born 1980), American politician from Florida
- Lynne Abruzzo, American scientist
- Matthew T. Abruzzo (1889–1971), American judge
- Michele Abruzzo (1904–1996), Italian actor
- Ray Abruzzo (born 1954), American actor
- Richard Abruzzo (1963–2010), American balloonist
- Tony Abruzzo (1916–1990), American comic book artist

== See also ==
- D'Abruzzo
