= Ambra =

Ambra may refer to:

- AMBRA Computer Corporation, a discontinued wholly owned subsidiary of IBM
- Ämbra, a village in Kareda Parish, Järva County, in northern-central Estonia
- Ambra grisea, ambergris
- Ambra Health, a company with software for medical image sharing
- Italian submarine Ambra
- Ambra Angiolini (born 1977), Italian TV host, singer, and actress
- Ambra Medda, design consultant
- Ambra Senatore (born 1976), Italian choreographer, researcher and educator
