= Agnė (given name) =

- Gender: Female
- Name day: 20 April

Origin
- Region of origin: Lithuania

Other names
- Related names: Agnes, Agnese

Agnė is a Lithuanian feminine given name. Individuals bearing the name Agnė include:

- Agnė Bilotaitė (born 1982), Lithuanian politician
- Agnė Čepelytė (born 1995), Lithuanian tennis player
- Agnė Eggerth (born 1978), Lithuanian track and field sprint athlete
- Agnė Grudytė (born 1986), Lithuanian actress and television presenter
- Agnė Sereikaitė (born 1994), Lithuanian short track speed skater
- Agnė Šerkšnienė (born 1988), Lithuanian sprinter
- Agnė Simonavičiūtė (born 1995), Lithuanian balloonist
- Agnė Vaiciukevičiūtė (born 1989), Lithuanian politician
