= Valerio =

- Gender: Male

Origin
- Origin: Latin nomen Valerius
- Region of origin: Italy

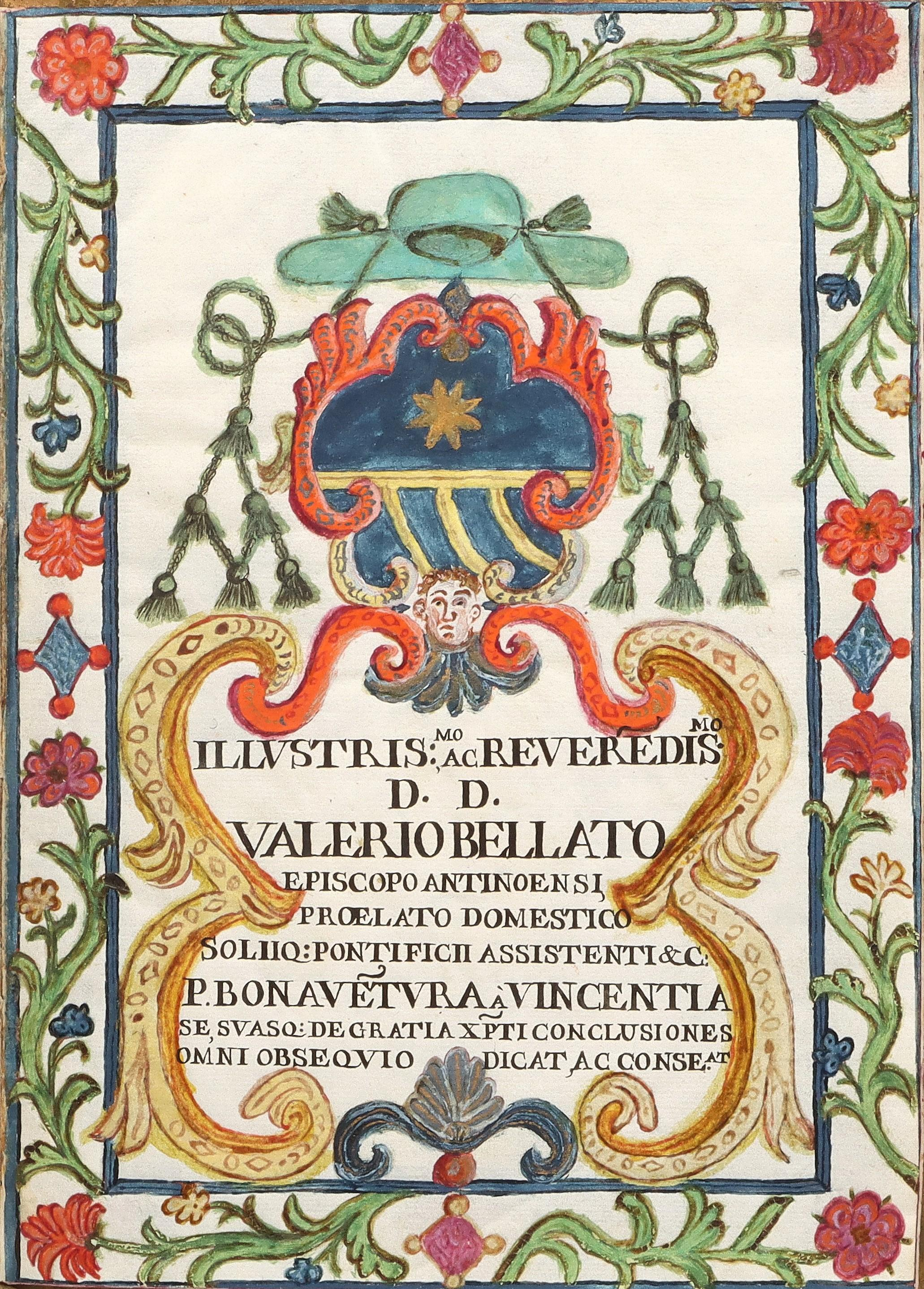
Valerio Bellati Coat of Arms

Valerio or Valério is a male given name in several languages, derived from the Roman surname Valerius, which itself is derived from the Latin verb valere, meaning "to be strong". Valerio is a relatively common given name in Italy, while its incidence is less common in the Spanish and Croatian Sprachraum. The Portuguese form of the name is Valério. The form of Valerio is Valeriu in the Romanian language.

Valerio is also a surname.

== Given name ==
- Valerio Adami (born 1935), Italian painter
- Valerio Agnoli (born 1985), Italian cyclist
- Valerio Anastasi (born 1990), Italian footballer
- Valerio Aspromonte (born 1987), Italian fencer
- Valerio Bacigalupo (1924–1949), Italian footballer
- Valerio Baldassari (c.1650–1695), Italian painter
- Valerio Belli (c.1468–1546), Italian engraver
- Valerio Bernabò (born 1984), Italian rugby player
- Valerio Bertotto (born 1973), Italian footballer
- Valerio Bianchini (born 1943), Italian basketball coach
- Valerio Cassani (1922–1995), Italian footballer
- Valerio Checchi (born 1980), Italian skier
- Valerio Cioli (1529–1599), Italian sculptor
- Valerio Cleri (born 1981), Italian swimmer
- Valerio Conti (born 1993), Italian cyclist
- Valerio Corte (1530–1580), Italian painter and alchemist
- Valerio de los Santos (born 1972), Dominican baseball player
- Valerio Di Cesare (born 1983), Italian footballer
- Valerio Evangelisti (1952–2022), Italian writer
- Valerio Festi, Italian artistic director and producer
- Valerio Fiori (born 1969), Italian footballer
- Valerio Giangiordano, illustrator of Nemesis: Rogues' Gallery (2024–2025)
- Valerio Jud (born 2002), Swiss snowboarder
- Valerio Laccetti (1836–1909), Italian painter
- Valerio Lualdi (born 1951), Italian cyclist
- Valerio Leccardi (born 1984), Swiss skier
- Valerio Magrelli (born 1957), Italian poet
- Valerio Massimo Manfredi (born 1943), Italian historian, journalist, and archaeologist
- Valerio Mastandrea (born 1972), Italian actor
- Valerio Nava (born 1994), Italian footballer
- Valerio Nawatu (born 1984), Fiji international footballer
- Valerio Olgiati (born 1958), Swiss architect
- Valerio Piva (1958), Italian cyclist
- Valerio Profondavalle (1533–c. 1600), Flemish painter
- Valerio Rosseti (born 1994), Italian footballer
- Valerio Staffelli (born 1963), Italian journalist and television personality
- Valerio Tebaldi (born 1965), Italian cyclist
- Valerio Varesi, Italian crime novelist
- Valerio Vermiglio (born 1976), Italian volleyball player
- Valerio Verre (born 1994), Italian footballer
- Valerio Virga (born 1986), Italian footballer
- Valerio Zanone (1936–2016), Italian politician
- Valerio Zurlini (1926–1982), Italian director and screenwriter

== Nickname ==
- Valerio Arri (1892–1970), Italian marathon runner

== Surname ==
- Alberto Valerio (born 1985), Brazilian racing driver
- Alessandro Valerio (1881-1955), Italian horse rider
- Charlie Valerio (born 1990), Dominican baseball player
- Edvaldo Valério (born 1978), Brazilian swimmer
- Elisabeth Valerio, Zimbabwean businesswoman and politician
- Gabriel Valerio, Italian drummer for Theatres des Vampires
- Joaquín Enrique Valerio (born 1973), Spanish footballer
- Joe Valerio (born 1969), American football player
- Luca Valerio (1552–1618), Italian mathematician
- Marcos Valério (born 1961), Brazilian convicted criminal
- Max Wolf Valerio (born 1957), American poet and writer
- Matt Valerio, American hip hop producer
- Melanie Valerio (born 1969), American Olympic swimmer
- Pompilio Cacho Valerio (born 1976), Honduran footballer
- Raúl Valerio (1927-2017), Mexican actor
- Renz Valerio (born 1998), Filipino actor and model
- Rui Manuel Sousa Valério (born 1964), Portuguese Catholic patriarch of Lisbon
- Samuel Valerio (fl. 16th century), Greek physician and author
- Magdalena Valerio (born 1959), Spanish congresswoman and former minister of labour, migration and social security

== See also ==
- Valeriote (surname)
