= Senatore =

Senatore is a surname. Notable people with the surname include:

- Ambra Senatore (born 1976), Italian choreographer, researcher and educator
- Leonardo Senatore (rugby union) (born 1984), Argentine rugby union player
- Lorenzo Senatore, ICG, AIC (born 1974), Italian cinematographer
- Paola Senatore (born 1949), Italian former film actress
- Pat Senatore (born 1935), American jazz bassist
- Pedro Senatore Ramos (born 1968), Ecuadorian footballer
- Sebastian Senatore (born 1985), Swedish/Uruguayan Soccer player
