= Pulisic =

Pulisic or Pulišić is a Croatian surname. It's the Croatized form of Puglisi. Notable people with the name include:

- Christian Pulisic (born 1998), American soccer player
- Mark Pulisic (born 1968), American soccer coach and former player, father of Christian Pulisic
- Will Pulisic (born 1998), American soccer player
- Vinko Pulišić (1853–1936), Croatian Roman Catholic Archbishop
