= Catalani =

Catalani is an Italian surname meaning "Catalan" or "from Catalonia". Notable people with the surname include:

- Adelina Catalani (fl. 1818–1832), Franco-Italian soprano
- Alfredo Catalani (1854–1893), Italian operatic composer
- Angelica Catalani (1780–1849), Italian opera singer
- Antonio Catalani (Romano) (c. 1596–unknown), also called il Romano, Italian painter
- Antonio Catalani (Siciliano) (1560–1630), also called il Siciliano, Italian painter
- Giuseppe Catalani (1698–1764), Italian liturgist
- Jordanus Catalani (fl. c. 1321–1330), French Dominican missionary and explorer
