= Ines Maria Ferraris =

Italian opera singer

- Ines Maria Ferraris photographed in Milan, 1912

Ines Maria Ferraris (also Ina Maria Ferraris; 6 May 1882, in Turin – 11 December 1971, in Milan) was an Italian operatic soprano and pianist who sang for more than two decades at La Scala in addition to international appearances. Although popular in Italy, she also had a particularly devoted fanbase throughout South America. A light lyric soprano with a voice considered pure and agile, Ferraris sang a large repertoire that encompassed the verismo operas of Puccini, the Italian grand opera of Verdi, and the German operas of Richard Strauss. She is particularly remembered for playing Lisette in the world première of Puccini's La rondine in 1917.

== Career ==
Ferraris was a child prodigy and began her career as a professional concert pianist at the young age of 12 after studying piano with Antonio Quartero. She later became interested in opera and began studying singing with Vittorio Vanzo in Milan. She gave her first professional performance as a vocalist in a concert in London in 1906. She made her professional operatic début two years later in Bologna as Philine in Mignon.

In 1911, Ferraris debuted at La Scala as Carolina in Cimarosa's Il matrimonio segreto. That same year, she sang Sophie at La Scala in Italy's first production of Der Rosenkavalier, a role she later reprised at the Teatro Costanzi in Rome in 1914. She remained at La Scala for over 20 years, singing numerous roles mostly from the lighter lyric and soubrette repertoire. She became a favorite of Arturo Toscanini under whom she sang numerous parts at La Scala including Violetta in Verdi's La traviata and Nannetta in Verdi's Falstaff. She was also a close friend of Conchita Supervia, with whom she performed many roles, including the role of Gretel opposite Supervia's Hänsel in Hänsel und Gretel. During this time, she also frequently performed throughout Italy and in South America, where she gained a big following. She notably sang the title role in South America's premiere of Ermanno Wolf-Ferrari's Il segreto di Susanna at the Teatro Colón in Buenos Aires. Her other roles in that house include Oscar in Un ballo in maschera, the title role in Catalani's La Wally, and Hélène in Une éducation manquée, among others.

In 1916, Ferraris sang the role of Violetta at the Teatro Massimo Palermo. The following year she created the role of Lisette in the world première of Puccini's La rondine at the Opéra de Monte-Carlo. She also made several appearances at the Teatro di San Carlo in 1920-1921 and 1924, including the role of Gilda in Rigoletto. Ferraris retired from the stage in 1934, after which she taught singing for many years at numerous conservatories including the Conservatorio di Musica Benedetto Marcello in Venice, the Conservatorio Giovanni Battista Martini in Bologna, the Accademia Musicale Chigiana in Siena, and lastly at the Milan Conservatory.

Her remains are at the Riparto 202 of the Cimitero Maggiore di Milano, inside the niche number 96.

== Recordings ==
Ferraris was among the first generation of musicians to be recorded. Most notably, she can be heard on highlight recordings of Der Rosenkavalier as Sophie and Hansel and Gretel as Gretel with Conchita Supervia, mementoes of their association in both operas at La Scala. She also recorded the role of Gilda in the first complete recording of Rigoletto in 1916 with Cesare Formichi in the title role.
