= Flaminia =

Flaminia may refer to:

== Historic places ==
- Via Flaminia, a Roman consular road that connected Rome to Rimini
- Via Flaminia minor, an ancient Roman road between Bononia and Arretium
- Flaminia et Picenum, a province of the Dioecesis Italiciana created by the emperor Diocletian (III-IV century); see Romagna
- Flaminia et Picenum Annonarium, a province of Italy Annonaria, created by the emperor Theodosius I (late 4th century); see Roman Italy

== People ==
- Flaminia, stage name of Elena Balletti (1686–1771), Italian actress
- Flaminia gens, an ancient Roman family
- Flaminia Cinque (born 1964), English actress
- Barbara Flaminia (1540–1586), Italian stage actress

== Vehicles ==
- Lancia Flaminia, car produced by Lancia from 1957 to 1970
- MSC Flaminia, a German container ship
- SS Flaminian, three steamships of the Ellerman & Papyanni Line
- MV Flaminia (1921), a passengership in service 1955-64

== Other uses ==
- ASD Flaminia Civita Castellana, or just Flaminia, an Italian football club from Civita Castellana, Lazio
- Flaminia, one of the Innamorati characters from the Italian Commedia dell'arte
- Flaminia (bug), a genus in the family Pentatomidae
- Flaminia (film), a 2024 Italian comedy film

== See also ==
- Flaminio (disambiguation)
