= Perotti =

Perotti is an Italian surname. Notable people with the surname include:

- Angelica Le Gru Perotti (1719–1776), Italian painter
- Diego Perotti (born 1988), Argentine footballer
- Fulvia Miani Perotti (1844–1931), Italian writer
- Giovanni Domenico Perotti (1761–1825), Italian composer
- José Perotti Ronzoni (1898–1956), Chilean sculptor
- Juan Perotti (born 1992), Argentine footballer
- Niccolò Perotti (1429–1480), Italian humanist and author
- Omar Perotti (born 1959), Argentine politician
