= Pellin =

Pellin or Pellín is both a given name and surname. Notable people with the name include:

== Given name ==
- Pellín Rodríguez (1926–1984), Puerto Rican singer

== Surname ==
- Cinzia Pellin (born 1973), Italian painter and set designer
- Marc-Antoine Pellin (born 1987), French basketball player
- Mendy Pellin (born 1982), American actor

== See also ==
- Pellin–Broca prism
