= Cinzia =

Cinzia may refer to:

- Cinzia De Carolis (born 1960), Italian actress and voice actress
- Cinzia Casiraghi, Professor in Nanoscience, University of Manchester, UK and National Graphene Institute in the UK
- Cinzia Cavazzuti (born 1973), Italian former judoka who competed in the 2000 and 2004 Summer Olympics
- Cinzia Frosio, Italian former competitive figure skater
- Cinzia Giorgio (born 1975), Italian writer
- Cinzia Leone (born 1959), Italian actress and comedian
- Cinzia Massironi (born 1966), Italian voice actress and actress
- Cinzia Monreale (born 1957), Italian actress
- Cinzia Pellin (born 1973), Italian artist
- Cinzia Perona (born 1973), retired Italian female volleyball player
- Cinzia Petrucci (born 1955), retired shot putter from Italy
- Cinzia De Ponti (born 1960), Italian actress, model, TV personality and Miss Italia 1979
- Cinzia Ragusa (born 1977), Italian water polo player and 2004 Summer Olympics gold medallist
- Cinzia Sasso (born 1956), Italian journalist and writer
- Cinzia Savi Scarponi (born 1963), Italian former swimmer who competed in the 1980 Summer Olympics
- Cinzia Tani (born 1958), Italian writer, television presenter and radio host
- Cinzia Verde, Italian researcher in marine biochemistry at the National Research Council (CNR)
- Cinzia Zehnder (born 1997), Swiss professional footballer

== See also ==
- Cinzia (graphic novel)
