= Chusaris figurata =

Scientific classification
- Kingdom: Animalia
- Phylum: Arthropoda
- Clade: Pancrustacea
- Class: Insecta
- Order: Lepidoptera
- Superfamily: Noctuoidea
- Family: Erebidae
- Genus: Chusaris
- Species: C. figurata

Binomial name
- Chusaris figurata (Moore, [1885])

Synonyms
- Helia figurata Moore, [1885]; Helia tessellata Hampson, 1893

Species of moth

Chusaris figurata is a moth of the family Noctuidae first described by Frederic Moore in 1885. It is found in Sri Lanka.
