= Antonio Catalani (Siciliano) =

Italian painter

Antonio Catalano, also called Catalani or il Siciliano, (1560–1630) was an Italian painter of the late-Renaissance and early-Baroque periods.

== Biography ==
He was born in Messina, Sicily, where he probably received some training from his father Antonio Catalano the Elder, also a painter, or one of the brothers, Francesco or Giovanni Simone Comande. Both the elder Catalano and the Comandè brothers were pupils of Diodato Guinaccia in Messina. He is thought to have studied in Rome, and strongly influenced by Federico Barocci. He painted a Nativity for the church of the Capuchins at Gesso, near Messina.
