= Proietti =

Proietti is an Italian surname. Notable people with the surname include:

- Biagio Proietti (1940–2022), Italian screenwriter, director and writer
- Cristiana Proietti, American fashion designer
- Gigi Proietti (1940–2020), Italian actor
- Francesco Cosimi Proietti (1951–2021), Italian politician
- Giovanni Proietti (born 1977), Italian footballer
- Jonathan Proietti (born 1982), Luxembourgian footballer
- Monica Proietti (1940–1967), Canadian bank robber
