= Giuseppe Catalani =

- Born: 14 June 1698; Paola, Calabria
- Died: 10 August 1764 (aged 66); Rome
- Occupations: Liturgist and scholar

Giuseppe Catalani (1698-1764), also known as Catalano or Catalanus, was a Roman Catholic liturgist of the eighteenth century, a member of the Hieronymite Oratory of San Girolamo della Carità.

He remains famous for his correct editions of the chief liturgical books of the Roman Church, some of which are still in habitual use, and which he enriched with scholarly commentaries illustrative of the history, rubrics and canon law of the Roman Liturgy. Among these are the Pontificale Romanum (3 volumes in fol., Rome, 1738–40, reprinted at Paris, 1850; re-edited by Muhlbauer, Augsburg, 1878), with an introduction and notes, and based on the best manuscripts; Caeremoniale episcoporum (2 volumes, in fol., Rome, 1747, with copperplate engravings; reprinted at Paris, 1860); Sacrarum Caeremoniarum sive rituum ecclesiasticorum S. R. ecclesiae libri tres... (1 volume in fol., Rome, 1750–51); Rituale Romanum Benedicti XIV jussu editum et auctum... (Rome, 1757, 2 volumes in fol.).

Catalani is also the author of works on the history, series, duties and privileges of two important curial offices: De Magistro Sacri Palatii libri duo (Rome, 1751) and De Secretario S. Congregatione Indicis libri duo (Rome, 1751). He also published annotated editions of two spiritual works: the letter of St. Jerome A Nepotianum suum (Rome, 1740) and St. John Chrysostom's work on the priesthood, De Sacerdotio, Rome, 1740).

Catalani composed a historical treatise on the reading of the Gospels at Mass, its origin, ancient usages, etc. (De codice Evangelii, Rome, 1733; see Acta erudit. Lips., 1735, 497-99). He also prepared an edition of the decrees of the ecumenical councils, which Father Hurter calls a very learned ("plane docta") work: "Sacrosancta concilia oecumenica commentariis illustrata" (Rome, 1736–49).

Finally, he published a new edition (Rome, 1753, 6 volumes in fol.) of Cardinal d'Aguirre's Collectio maxima conciliorum Hispaniae et Novi Orbis, i.e. of Mexico and South America (first published at Rome, in 1693).

== Sources ==
- Lauro, Agostino (1979). "CATALANI, Giuseppe". Dizionario Biografico degli Italiani (in Italian). Vol. 22: Castelvetro–Cavallotti. Rome: Istituto dell'Enciclopedia Italiana. ISBN 978-88-12-00032-6.
