= Chusaris retatalis =

Scientific classification
- Kingdom: Animalia
- Phylum: Arthropoda
- Clade: Pancrustacea
- Class: Insecta
- Order: Lepidoptera
- Superfamily: Noctuoidea
- Family: Erebidae
- Genus: Chusaris
- Species: C. retatalis

Binomial name
- Chusaris retatalis Walker, 1859

Species of moth

Chusaris retatalis is a moth of the family Noctuidae first described by Francis Walker in 1859. It is found in Sri Lanka.
