= Casadei =

Casadei is an Italian surname. Notable people with the surname include:

- Barbara Casadei, American doctor and academic
- Domenico Casadei, Italian engineer
- Fabio Casadei Turroni, Italian novelist
- Maurizio Casadei, Sammarinese cyclist
- Secondo Casadei, Italian musician
- Cesare Casadei, Italian footballer
