= Enea =

Enea may be:

- Enea (moth), a genus of moths of the family Noctuidae
- Enea S.A., a Polish power company
- Enea Bastianini, an Italian motorcycle racer
- Enea Hodoș, an Austro-Hungarian and Romanian writer and folklorist
- Enea (film), 2023 film
- Enea, from the eponymous Aeneas, alternative name for Europe found in Snorri

ENEA may be:

- ENEA (Italy), the Italian National Agency for New Technologies, Energy and the Sustainable economic development
- ENEA AB, a Swedish information technology company
