= Claude Brumachon =

French choreographer

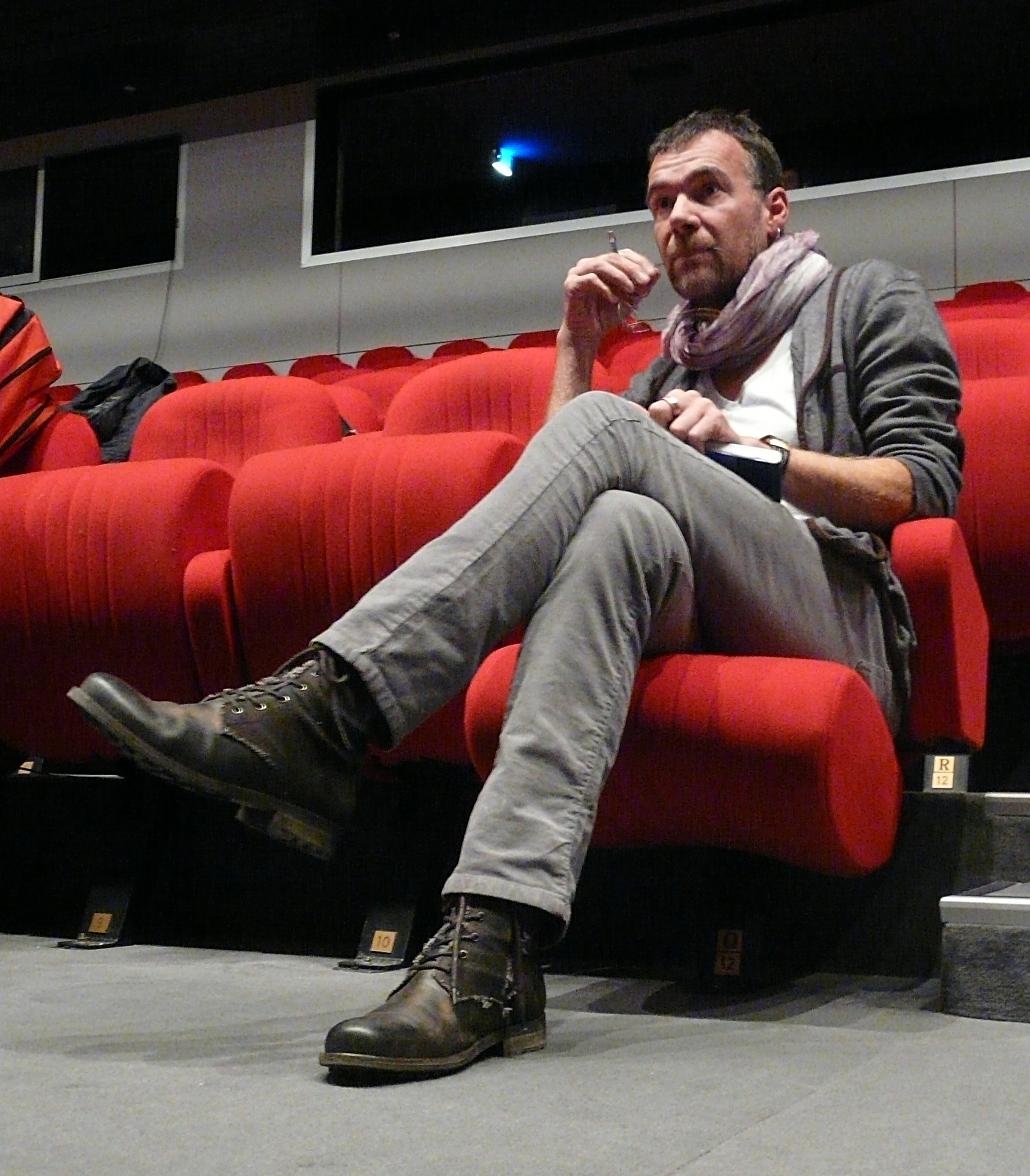
Claude Brumachon

Claude Brumachon (born 2 May 1959 in Rouen) is a French choreographer and dancer in contemporary dance. In 1984 he founded his own company, the Compagnie Claude Brumachon. Since 1992, he has been co-directing the Centre Chorégraphique National de Nantes (National Choreographic Centre of Nantes), with Benjamin Lamarche.

He has won several concours de Bagnolet awards:

- in 1984 with Atterrissage de corneilles sur l'Autoroute du sud (three awards)
- in 1988 with Texane

== Creations ==
- 1982: Niverolles, duo du col
- 1983: Il y a des engoulevents sur la branche d'à côté
- 1983: Épervière
- 1984: Atterrissage de corneilles sur l'Autoroute du sud
- 1984: Nyroca Furie
- 1984: Le Sirli de Béjaïa (for the Jeune Ballet de France)
- 1984: La Tristesse des pingouins dans l'Arctique
- 1985: Oc le narquois et Oriane l'effraie
- 1986: Le Roncier où songe l'aimante Pie-Grièche
- 1986: Vagabond des Bastides
- 1986: La Dérive des fous à pieds bleus
- 1987: Attila et Nana, les moineaux friquets
- 1987: Les Querelles de Harfangs (for the Jeune Ballet de France)
- 1987: La Complainte du Gerfaut
- 1988: Texane
- 1988: Bricolage Secret
- 1988: Le Piédestal des vierges
- 1988: Les Naufragés
- 1989: Féline (commissioned by the Groupe de recherche chorégraphique de l'Opéra de Paris)
- 1989: Folie
- 1989: Le Chapelier Travail du chapeau
- 1990: L'enfant et les sortilèges (for the Opéra de Nantes)
- 1991: Éclats d'Absinthe
- 1991: Fauves
- 1992: Alice aux pays des Merveilles
- 1992: Les Funambules du Désir (for the Jeune Ballet de France and the Ballet Philippines)
- 1992: Lame de Fond
- 1992: Les Indomptés
- 1992: Vertige
- 1992: Les déambulations de Lola
- 1992: Alice aux pays des Merveilles
- 1992: Les Funambules du Désir (for the Jeune Ballet de France and the Ballet Philippines)
- 1992: Lame de Fond
- 1992: Les Indomptés
- 1992: Vertige
- 1992: Les déambulations de Lola
- 1993: Nina ou la voleuse d'esprit (performed at Musée des Beaux-Arts de Nantes)
- 1993: Émigrants
- 1993: Les Amants gris (for the Conservatoire national supérieur de musique et de danse de Paris)
- 1994: Bohèmes Hommes
- 1995: Les Avalanches
- 1996: Les Larmes des Dieux
- 1996: Una Vita
- 1996: Icare
- 1997: Bohèmes Femmes
- 1997: Le Magicien d'Oz
- 1997: La Blessure (duo commissioned by Marie-Claude Pietragalla)
- 1997: Les Nuits perdues (Kadotetut Yöt, commissioned by the Raatikko Ballet of Vantaa)
- 1997: Los Ruegos
- 1997: Une Aventure Extraordinaire
- 1998: Dandy
- 1998: Humains dites-vous !
- 1999: La fracture de l'âme
- 1999: Embrasés
- 1999: Les murailles d'hermine (commissioned by the Ballet du Rhin)
- 1999: La femme qui voulait parler avec le vent
- 1999: Les voyageurs d'innocence (for the Ballet de Marseille)
- 1999: Absence
- 2000: Hôtel Central
- 2000: Imprévus ou les porteurs de rêves
- 2000: Pinocchio
- 2000: Les Chemins oubliés ou le temps d'un songe (homage to Jules Verne)
- 2001: Rebelles
- 2001: Les Coquelicots Sauvages
- 2002: Voyages de Gulliver
- 2002: L'Ombre des Mots
- 2002: Le Témoin (Bohémia Magica festival)
- 2003: Boxeurs et Vagabondes
- 2003: Écorchés Vifs (performed at Musée Bourdelle)
- 2003: L'héroïne ou la gloire imprudente (commissioned by the Ballet de Lorraine)
- 2004: Le Festin
- 2005: Orphée (performed at Grand Théâtre de Limoges)
- 2005: Les Petits Poètes
- 2005: La Mélancolie des Profondeurs (with vocal ensemble A Sei Voci)
- 2006: Ellipse
- 2007: Histoire d'Argan le Visionnaire
- 2007: Silence
- 2007: Phobos
- 2008: Le Labyrinthe
- 2008: Androgynes
- 2009: Les Explorateurs de Temps
- 2009: Merveilleux
- 2009: Les Fugues
- 2009: La Désobéissance (rituel)
- 2009: Liberté (premiered in Nantes at "Le Grand T" theatre on 7 January 2010)
- 2010: Le Prince de Verre

== Decorations ==
- Commander of the Order of Arts and Letters (2016)
