= Chusaris idaeoides =

Scientific classification
- Kingdom: Animalia
- Phylum: Arthropoda
- Clade: Pancrustacea
- Class: Insecta
- Order: Lepidoptera
- Superfamily: Noctuoidea
- Family: Erebidae
- Genus: Chusaris
- Species: C. idaeoides

Binomial name
- Chusaris idaeoides Hampson, 1891

Synonyms
- Rhynchina idaeoides Hampson, 1891

Species of moth

Chusaris idaeoides is a moth of the family Noctuidae described by George Hampson in 1891. It is found in Sri Lanka.
