= Micol =

Micol may refer to

- Micol (given name), given name
- Giovanna Micol, Italian sports sailor
