= Pugliesi =

Pugliesi is a surname. Notable people with the surname include:

- Irondi Pugliesi (1947–2021), Brazilian politician
- Maurizio Pugliesi (born 1976), Italian footballer

== See also ==
- Puglisi, another surname
