= Centre Chorégraphique National de Nantes =

Dance company based in Nantes, France

The Centre Chorégraphique National de Nantes (Breton: Kreizenn Vroadel Koreografiezh Naoned) is a dance company, based in Nantes, France.

== History and operations ==
Claude Brumachon and Benjamin Lamarche were the co-directors of the company. Ambra Senatore became director in 2016.

== See also ==
- Culture of Brittany
- Dance in France
- List of dance companies
