= Duccio (disambiguation) =

Duccio (c. 1255/60 – c. 1318/19) was an Italian painter.

Duccio may also refer to:

== People ==
- Agostino di Duccio (1418–c. 1481), Italian sculptor
- Duccio Chiarini (born 1977), Italian film director, documentarist, screenwriter and producer
- Duccio Degli Innocenti (born 2003), Italian footballer
- Duccio Galimberti (1906–1944), Italian lawyer and resistance fighter
- Duccio Innocenti (born 1975), Italian football manager and former player
- Duccio Malagamba (born 1960), Italian architectural photographer
- Duccio Rocchini (born 1975), Italian ecologist and educator
- Duccio Tessari (1926–1994), Italian film director, screenwriter and actor

== Astronomy ==
- Duccio (crater), a crater on Mercury
- 11621 Duccio, a main-belt asteroid

== See also ==
- Ducci
