= Fulvio =

Fulvio is a given name. Notable people with the name include:

- Fulvio de Assis (born 1981), Brazilian professional basketball player
- Fulvio Bacchelli (born 1951), former Italian rally driver, won Rally New Zealand in 1977
- Fulvio Balatti (1938–2001), Italian rower
- Fulvio Ballabio (born 1954), race car driver born in Milan, Italy
- Fulvio Bernardini (1905–1984), Italian professional footballer and coach
- Fulvio Caccia (born 1952), contemporary Italian poet, novelist and essayist
- Fulvio Cecere (born 1960), Canadian actor
- Fulvio Collovati (born 1957), Italian former footballer, who played defence
- Fulvio Conti (born 1947), Italian financier
- Fulvio Giulio della Corgna) (1517–1583), Tuscan Catholic bishop and cardinal
- Fulvio Croce, (1901–1977), Italian lawyer killed by the terrorist association Red Brigades
- Fulvio Dapit (born 1975), Italian male sky runner
- Fulvio Falzarano, Italian actor
- Fulvio Fantoni (born 1963), Italian international bridge player
- Fulvio Flavoni (born 1970), Italian football goalkeeper
- Fulvio Chester "Chet" Forte (1935–1996), American television director and sports radio talk show host
- Fulvio Francesconi (born 1944), retired Italian professional footballer
- Fulvio Galimi (1927–2016), Argentine fencer who practised foil, épée and sabre
- Fulvio Lorigiola (born 1959), former Italian rugby union player, a current sports executive and a lawyer
- Fulvio Lucisano (born 1928), Italian film producer
- Fulvio Martini (1923–2003), Italian Navy admiral and intelligence officer
- Fulvio Martusciello (born 1968), Italian politician, and a member of the European Parliament since 2014
- Fulvio Melia (born 1956), Italian-American physicist/astrophysicist and author
- Fulvio Mingozzi, (1925–2000), Italian actor
- Fulvio Miyata (born 1977), Brazilian judoka
- Fulvio Nesti (1925–1996), Italian footballer
- Fulvio Orsini (1529–1600), Italian humanist, historian, and archaeologist
- Fulvio Palmieri (1903–1966), Italian screenwriter
- Fulvio Pea (born 1967), Italian football coach
- Fulvio Pelli (born 1951), Swiss politician
- Fulvio Pennacchi (1905–1992), Italian-Brazilian artist in drawing, painting, mural painting and ceramics
- Fulvio Rocchi (born 1909), Argentine sports shooter
- Fulvio Roiter (1926–2016), Italian photographer
- Fulvio Saini (born 1962), Italian football midfielder
- Fulvio Salamanca (1921–1999), Argentine tango musician
- Fulvio Scola (born 1982), Italian cross-country skier
- Fúlvio Stefanini (born 1939), Brazilian actor
- Fulvio Sulmoni (born 1986), Swiss footballer (defence)
- Fulvio Tesorieri (died 1616), Roman Catholic prelate, Bishop of Belcastro (1612–1616)
- Fulvio Testi (1593–1646), Italian diplomat and poet
- Fulvio Tomizza (1935–1999), Italian language writer
- Fulvio Valbusa (born 1969), Italian cross-country skier
- Fulvio Wetzl (born 1953), Italian filmmaker

== See also ==
- Andrea Fulvio (c. 1470 – 1527), Renaissance humanist, poet and antiquarian of Rome, advisor to Raphael
- 11465 Fulvio, minor planet
