= Chusaris paucimaculata =

Scientific classification
- Kingdom: Animalia
- Phylum: Arthropoda
- Clade: Pancrustacea
- Class: Insecta
- Order: Lepidoptera
- Superfamily: Noctuoidea
- Family: Erebidae
- Genus: Chusaris
- Species: C. paucimaculata

Binomial name
- Chusaris paucimaculata Hampson, 1893

Species of moth

Chusaris paucimaculata is a moth of the family Noctuidae first described by George Hampson in 1893. It is found in Sri Lanka.
