= Manieri =

Manieri is an Italian surname which is the plural and patronymic form of Mainiero. Notable people with the surname include:

- Carlo Manieri (fl 1662–1700), Italian painter
- Maria Rosaria Manieri (born 1943), Italian academic and politician
- Raffaella Manieri (born 1986), Italian football player
