= Fulvia Célica =

Peruvian politician

Fulvia Célica Siguas Sandoval was a Peruvian transsexual woman. She had 64 different operations since 1979, to change her physical sexual characteristics, or for cosmetic enhancements, and is the Guinness Book of World Records record holder for the most gender reassignment surgeries. Sandoval, who was on TV for practicing clairvoyance, hit the news in 1998, when she registered as a candidate in the mayoral elections in Lima, Peru. She reported to the news agency Reuters: "I have liked politics for a long time, but people like me have always been marginalized. Because I have been operated on, they think I am simply a queer."

Sandoval died on September 10, 2004, in her apartment in Jesus María, Lima.
