= Catanese =

Catanese is an Italian surname, meaning literally "Catanian", "from the city of Catania" or "from the province of Catania" (Catania is the capital of the province of Catania, and is the second-largest city in Sicily and the tenth in Italy). Notable people with the surname include:

- Anthony Catanese, President of Florida Institute of Technology 2002–2016
- Giovanni Catanese (born 1993), Italian football player
- P. W. Catanese, American writer
- Tarcisio Catanese (1967–2017), Italian football player
