= Valeriote (surname) =

Valeriote is an Italian surname.

== List of people with the surname ==
- Frank Valeriote (born 1954), Canadian politician
- Jeremy Valeriote, Canadian politician
