= Violante =

Violante may refer to:

== Given name ==
- Duchess Violante Beatrice of Bavaria (1673–1731), Grand Princess of Tuscany
- Violante Beatrice Siries (1709–1783), Italian painter
- Violante do Ceo (1601–1693), Portuguese writer and nun
- Violante Placido (born 1976), Italian actress and singer
- Violante Atabalipa Ximenes de Bivar e Vellasco (1817–1875), Brazilian writer and feminist
- Violante of Vilaragut, Majorcan noble
- Violante Visconti (1354–1386), Italian noble

== Other ==
- Luciano Violante (born 1941), Italian judge and politician
- Signora Violante, 18th century dancer and theatre company manager.
- Violante (Titian), oil painting
- Violante Inlet, inlet in Antarctica
