= Flavia Lüscher =

Swiss footballer (born 2003)

Personal information
- Date of birth: 31 October 2003 (age 22)
- Place of birth: Oberentfelden, Switzerland
- Height: 1.75 m (5 ft 9 in)
- Position: Defender

Flavia Lüscher (born 31 October 2003) is a Swiss footballer who plays as a defender for Austrian Football Bundesliga side SC Rheindorf Altach. Lüscher previously played for FC Basel, 1. FFC Turbine Potsdam, and FC Aarau on loan.

She is also training to be electrical planner whilst playing professional football part time.

== Honours ==
- 2. Frauen-Bundesliga: 2024
