= Maltese (surname) =

Maltese is an Italian surname, meaning literally "Maltese" or "from Malta". Notable people with the surname include:

- Dario Maltese (born 1992), Italian footballer
- Enrico V. Maltese (born 1952), Italian Byzantinist and professor
- Matt Maltese (born 1997), British-Canadian singer-songwriter
- Michael Maltese (1908–1981), American writer, actor, soundtrack composer
- Serphin R. Maltese (born 1932), American politician
