= Francesco Comandè =

Italian painter

Francesco Comande (16th century) was an Italian painter of a Renaissance style, born and active in Messina, Sicily.

He was a pupil of Deodato Guinaccia. His brother Simone Comande, born in 1588, was also a painter, and collaborated with his brother. Their styles differed with Simone having a style more influenced by the Venetian school. Simone painted a Martyrdom of St Bartholemew in Messina, and an Adoration of the Magi for the monastery of Basicò.

== Sources ==
- Boni, Filippo de' (1852). Biografia degli artisti ovvero dizionario della vita e delle opere dei pittori, degli scultori, degli intagliatori, dei tipografi e dei musici di ogni nazione che fiorirono da'tempi più remoti sino á nostri giorni. Seconda Edizione.. Venice; Googlebooks: Presso Andrea Santini e Figlio. p. 239.
