= Gioele =

Gioele is a masculine Italian given name. Notable people with the name include:

- Gioele Bertolini (born 1995), Italian cyclist
- Gioele Celerino (born 1993), Italian rugby league player
- Gioele Dix (born 1956), Italian actor and comedian
- Gioele Pellino (born 1983), Italian motorcycle racer
- Gioele Zacchi (born 2003), Italian footballer
