= Ottavia =

- Pronunciation: /otˈta.vja/
- Gender: Feminine
- Language: Italian
- Name day: 20 November (Italy)

Origin
- Origin: Latin
- Meaning: Eighth

Other names
- Variant form: Ottaviana
- Related names: Ottavio

Ottavia (/otˈta.vja/) is a Latin origin feminine given name. It is the feminine version of Ottavio and has a variant, Ottaviana. The name means "eighth". Its name day is 20 November in Italy which is celebrated in honor of Saint Ottavio the Martyr.

People with the name include:

- Claudia Ottavia, Roman empress and wife of Nero
- Ottavia Penna Buscemi (1907–1986), Italian politician
- Ottavia Cestonaro (born 1995), Italian athlete
- Ottavia Piccolo (born 1949), Italian actress
- Ottavia Vitagliano (1894–1975), Italian writer, editor and publisher
