= Agnese =

Agnese is a given name and a variant of Agnes. Its name day is 21 January in Italy.

People with the name Agnese include:

- Agnese Allegrini (born 1982), Italian badminton player
- Agnese Bonfantini (born 1999), Italian football player
- Agnese Koklača (born 1990), Latvian luger
- Agnese Krasta (born 1986), Latvian politician
- Agnese Lāce (1987), Latvian politician
- Agnese Līckrastiņa (born 1972), Latvian chess Woman International Master
- Agnese Logina (born 1990), Latvian film curator and politician
- Agnese Maffeis (born 1965), Italian discus thrower and shot putter
- Agnese del Maino (c. 1401–1465), Milanese noblewoman and the mistress of Filippo Maria Visconti
- Agnese di Montefeltro (1470–1523), daughter of Federico da Montefeltro, duke of Urbino
- Agnese Nano (born 1965), Italian film, TV and theater actress
- Agnese Ozoliņa (born 1979), Latvian swimmer
- Agnese Pastare (born 1988), Latvian race walker
- Agnese Possamai (born 1953), Italian middle distance runner
- Agnese Rakovska, Latvian singer, member of the band Triana Park
- Agnese Visconti (1363–1391), daughter of Bernabò Visconti

== Fictional characters ==
- Agnese Mondella, one of the main characters in Alessandro Manzoni's novel The Betrothed

== See also ==
- Agnese (opera), an opera by Paer
- Battista Agnese (c. 1500–1564), Genovese cartographer
- Gino Agnese (1936–2026), Italian journalist, biographer and essayist
