= Flavia Eberhard =

Brazilian free-diver and presenter of TV series "APNEIA"

Flavia Dias Eberhard, known as Flavia Eberhard (born in Santa Catarina), is a Brazilian free-diver, presenter of TV series "APNEIA", freediving instructor trainer, international fashion and underwater model, conservationist, and TV personality. She has nine freediving records including a South American Absolute Record on the discipline of free immersion. Eberhard also works with underwater videography and underwater photography with Sea Dragons audiovisual and has presented documentaries for the TV and film festivals.

== Career ==
=== Modeling ===
Flavia Eberhard was working as a professional model since the age of seventeen when she left Brazil to follow a successful modelling career. She was scouted by FORD Models in Brazil and worked for various designers and participated in several campaigns in Brazil, her home country, and internationally. She has worked for magazines such as Vogue, Elle, Marie Claire, Claudia and worked for various designers such as Armani, Gucci and Versace besides many others. She has also worked for TV commercials such as Pakalolo and H&M. Eberhard currently models internationally for fashion and as an underwater model. Flavia also offers workshops for underwater models all over the world uniting her two passions, modeling and fashion.

=== Freediving ===
Being brought up in Florianópolis island in Brazil, she was always practicing water sports from an early age such as surfing, windsurfing and bodyboarding. Her brother practiced spearfishing and since youth she was introduced through him to breath-hold games and practices, but it was later that she would pursue her professional freediving career. In 2004 she took her first diving course and felt passionate about being under the sea, continuing her education till becoming a technical diver. While based in London due to her modelling career in 2007 she was introduced to freediving and became a competitive freediver in 2009, the same year that she started teaching professionally. She since has nine records in total including a Brazilian Absolute Record (deepest between man and woman) and South American record. She has also won and participated in several competitions internationally representing Brazil. Flavia Eberhard is the only Brazilian freediving instructor professionally specialised in three of the most important freediving institutions SSI, as the only Brazilian Instructor Trainer, AIDA as a Master Instructor, and Apnea Total as a Master Instructor too. She now owns Freedive Mexico, a freediving school in Tulum, Mexico.

=== Media work ===
Flavia Eberhard is the presenter, host and co-producer of TV series APNEIA for Canal OFF where she travels around the world freediving in the most beautiful locations looking for the most incredible animal encounters. Flavia is a co-founder and partner of Sea Dragons audiovisual where she helps produce, film and photograph videos, some of which have participate of a short film festival Silently in Belgrade with the films Encounters in 2014 and Mabul in 2015. Eberhard has presented a documentary for Brazilian TV Canal Off about freediving in January 2015. She also writes and contributes in articles of magazines and a speaker in shows and conferences on the topic of freediving and underwater photography and videography.

=== Freediving records and titles ===
April 2009 - Bizzy Blue Hole Competition-

- 1st place at Static Competition, 3rd place overall
- 5 ft 15 in Static Absolute record for Santa Catarina
- 50 m Constant Weight Absolute record for Santa Catarina

May 2009 - Mini Comp Competition

- 3rd place overall
- 40 m Free Immersion Absolute record for Santa Catarina

June 2009- Blue Hole No More Competition

- 1st place overall
- 35 m Constant No Fins Absolute Record for Santa Catarina
- 55 m Constant Weight Absolute Record for Santa Catarina

Sept 2009- Triple Depth Competition

- 8th place overall
- 51 m Free Immersion Absolute Record for Santa Catarina
- 60 m Constant Weight Record for Santa Catarina

Sept 2012 Little Blue hole Competition

- 69 m Brazil and South American Absolute Record in Free Immersion

=== Other titles ===
Besides the competitions, Flavia Eberhard is a yoga teacher and also an international freediving judge AIDA, a Technical Diver TDI and a first aid instructor (RRR) by SSI.

=== Awards ===
She has received awards as the Best Contributor and Pride of an Institution by the number of certified freedivers achieved and has taught and coached many freediving national record holders. A photo of her free-diving in Mexico by Zena Holloway won the BBC's 2020 Underwater Photographer of the Year for the black-and-white category.
