= Deodato Guinaccia =

Italian painter

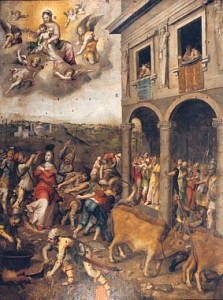
Deodato Guinaccia, The Martyrdom of St. Lucy, Church of Santa Lucia alla Badia, Syracuse, Sicily

Deodato Guinaccia or Diodato (Naples, c. 1510 – 1585?) was an Italian painter of the Renaissance period, active mainly in Messina, Sicily.

== Biography ==
Born in Naples, he moved to Messina as a young boy. There, he became the pupil of the painter Polidoro da Caravaggio, who had moved there after the 1528 Sack of Rome.

Guinaccia painted the Trinity for the church of the Confraternita de Pellegrini in Messina. He painted a Transfiguration for the church of San Salvatore de Greci. He painted an Adoration of Christ-child for the church of San Giacomo (Milazzo) in Messina, a Nativity for the church of the Cappuccini in Ragusa, a Martyrdom of Santa Lucia for the church of Santa Lucia alla Badia in Siracusa; and an Immaculate Conception for the church of Santa Maria del Gesu in Messina.

Among the pupils of Guinaccia in Messina were Cesare di Napoli, Francesco and Giovanni Simone Comande, and Antonio Catalano the Elder.
