= Napoli (surname) =

Napoli is an Italian surname. Notable people with the surname include:

- Aiman Napoli (born 1989), Italian footballer
- Alexander J. Napoli (1905–1972), a United States federal judge
- Donna Jo Napoli (b. 1948), author and linguist
- Emanuele Napoli, painter and restorer at the Royal Palace of Capodimonte in the reign of Ferdinand IV.
- Jacopo Napoli (1911–1994), Italian composer
- Jeanne Napoli (1938–2010), American singer and songwriter
- Mike Napoli (born 1981), Major League Baseball player with the Cleveland Indians.
- Nicola Napoli (1905–1982), founder of Artkino Pictures
- Nicolò Napoli (born 1962), Italian footballer
- Rose Napoli, Canadian playwright and actor
- Tommaso Napoli (1659–1725), Italian architect
- William Napoli (b. 1948), state senator in South Dakota, United States
- Arturo Di Napoli (born 1974), Italian footballer
- Fernando De Napoli (born 1964), Italian footballer
- Gennaro Di Napoli (born 1968), Italian middle-distance runner
- Patrick Esposito Di Napoli (1964–1994), Canadian musician
- Patrick de Napoli (born 1975), Swiss footballer
- Thomas DiNapoli (born 1954), American politician
