= Gemma Puglisi =

American media scholar

Gemma Puglisi is an author, media expert, pundit and assistant professor of communication at American University in Washington, D.C.

== Education ==
Puglisi attended Trinity University-Washington where she earned a B.A. in music with a concentration in piano. She graduated first in the class of 1978 with a Magna Cum Laude Latin honors award. Puglisi was also a member of the choral society at Trinity and was awarded the T-Pin student award.

Puglisi earned her M.A. in drama at The Catholic University of America, where she was given the opportunity to teach and perform in Poznan, Poland following her graduation.

== Career ==
Puglisi is a former journalist and public relations executive and frequently comments on high-profile cases and breaking news stories. She has appeared on CNN International, Fox News Channel’s The O’Reilly Factor and The Big Story. Her other credits include WUSA-TV, Channel 9, XM Satellite Radio’s "Broadminded," KXOM-AM & FM Radio, and she has been quoted in many media outlets including the Associated Press, abcnews.com; The Irish Times, Agence France-Presse, The Hollywood Reporter, The Washington Post, The Washington Times, nbcsports.com; sportsillustrated.com; Sarasota Herald-Tribune, Roll Call, Boston Herald and the Congressional Quarterly.

Puglisi began her career in the entertainment field working for the MEW Talent Agency in New York City. She later worked for talent manager Vincent Cirrincione. Puglisi entered radio working for DIR Broadcasting and then for NBC Radio. She continued her career at NBC and joined the news division working for various programs and departments including NBC Nightly News with Tom Brokaw the Today Show, the network assignment desk, the New York Bureau, MSNBC and on documentaries.

Puglisi then turned to public relations and worked as a media relations manager and market reporter for the Nasdaq Stock Market; vice president for Powell/Tate; and as vice president, Manager of Media, New York for Edelman PR Worldwide. After her career in both the media and public relations, Puglisi began teaching at American University, becoming an assistant professor in the School of Communication.

In 2013, Puglisi served as a panelist in a PR Week feature where she commented on the competitive nature of the public relations industry and provided tips and suggestions on how students could better prepare themselves for the professional field with internships.

At the 2019 PRSA International Conference in San Diego, California, Puglisi was a keynote speaker in the seminar "Shared Challenges: Educators and Practitioners Unite on Ethics, Diversity, Dialogue and Adjunct Teaching." There, she lectured on new innovate resources available for public relations professionals to reference when dealing with issues of diversity, ethics, and writing in the public relations industry.

Puglisi currently works as an assistant professor of public relations and strategic communications at the School of Communications at American University where she teaches public speaking and the public relations and strategic communications capstone portfolio. She has been teaching since 2003.

== Academic and professional works ==
Puglisi is the author of Public Relations Campaigns and Portfolio Building published by Allyn and Bacon for Pearson Education. The book is based on classes she taught at American University.

Puglisi is the author of a number of academic works, including her own textbook Public Relations Campaigns and Portfolio Building, which details how students can build their own professional public relations portfolio. Public Relations Campaigns and Portfolio Building draws from various case studies and examples within the public relations industry in order to demonstrate how to plan and implement a full strategic public relations plan, manage multiple clients, and measuring and delivering final results.

Puglisi is the co-author of the article Disruption in PR Education: Online Master’s Degree Programs in Public Relations and Strategic Communication, a research study that looks at the various online public relations and strategic communications programs offered by universities throughout the United States. It was written in conjunction with American University professors Paula L. Weissman, Dario Bernardini, and Joseph Graf. It is the first comprehensive study of its design.

Puglisi's other notable academic works include two book reviews on How Student Journalists Report Campus Unrest by Professor Kaylene Dial Armstrong and Talking About Torture: How Political Discourse Shapes Debate by Professor Jared Del Russo. Puglisi is also the author of several commentary pieces that have been featured in Women's Media Center and The Washington Post.

== Advocacy work ==
She has written extensively about the death penalty, particularly on the case involving death row inmate, Troy Anthony Davis. Her opinion pieces have been published by Washington Post, Atlanta Constitution, Savannah News, and Chronicle of Higher Education.
