= Duccio Rocchini =

Italian bioinformatician, ecologist and researcher

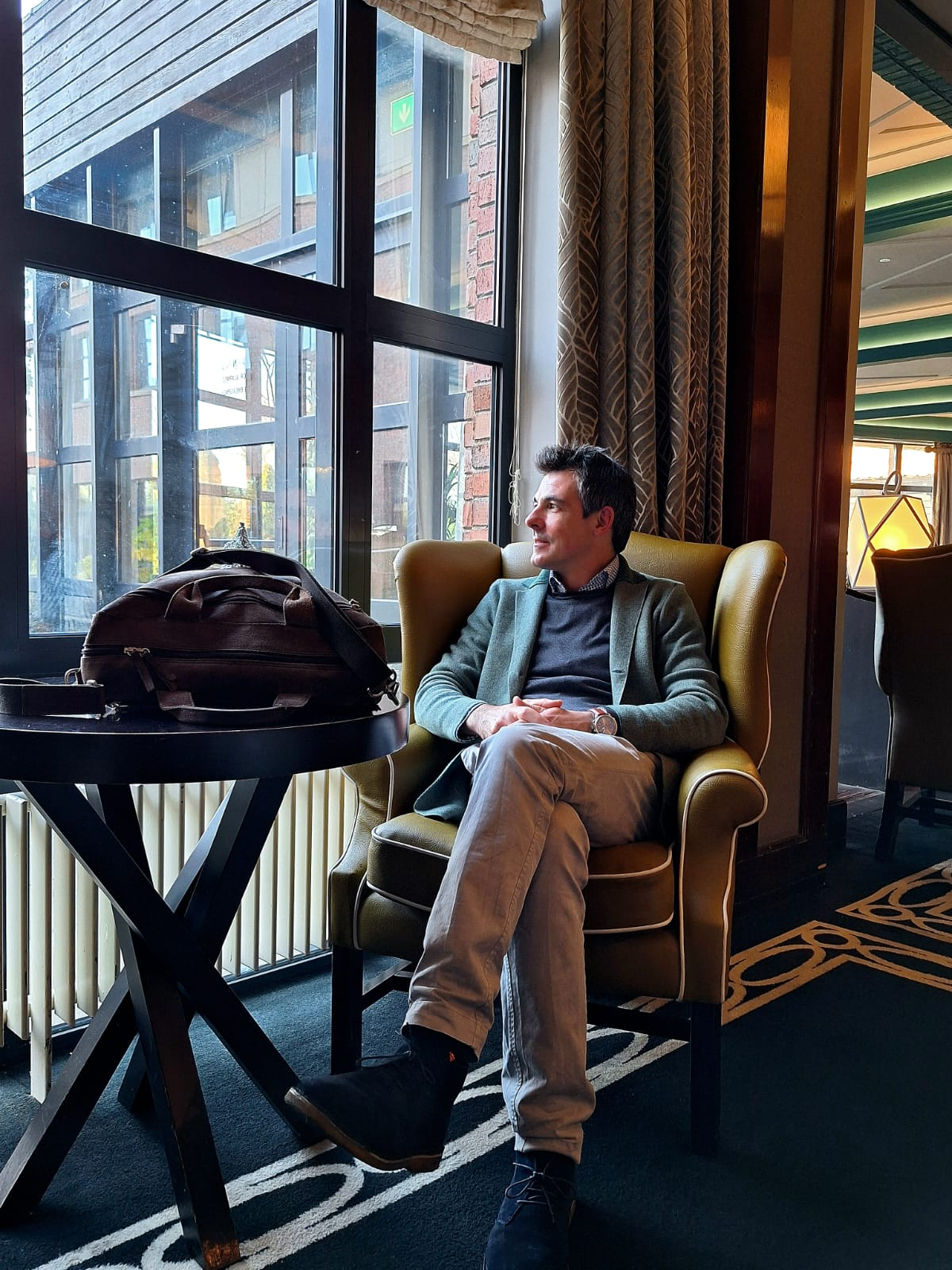
- Duccio Rocchini at the University of Limerick (Ireland)
- Born: August 29, 1975 (age 51); Siena, Italy
- Education: University of Siena
- Known for: – Creating the R package cblindplot for color blind people – Use of large-scale remote sensing for ecological use – Introduction of spectral species
- Scientific career
- Fields: Computational ecology, ecological computing, mathematical ecology, remote sensing, spatial ecology, species distribution modelling, theoretical ecology.

Duccio Rocchini (born August 29, 1975) is an Italian ecologist and educator. Since 2019, he has been serving as a full professor at the University of Bologna and holds an honorary professorship at the Czech University of Life Sciences Prague.

His career is marked by a commitment to ecology and biodiversity, having published over 200 papers in the field of ecology and beyond, with an H-index of 59 according to Google Scholar.

Rocchini created a package called "cblindplot" for the R programming language, which makes it easier for people with color blindness to interpret colorimetric maps.

He proposes the use of remote sensing for large-scale monitoring, presenting Rao's Q for analyzing remote sensing data. This approach overcomes the drawbacks of existing methods such as Shannon entropy, providing a tool for researchers when assessing biodiversity.

It emphasizes the spectral variation hypothesis (SVH), introducing "spectral species" through high-resolution remote sensing. The identification of separate spectral entities at landscape scales offered a direct approach to derive α- and β-diversity maps, improving understanding of biodiversity dynamics over large geographic areas.

He specializes in biodiversity analysis across multiple spatial scales, computational ecology, ecological informatics, mathematical ecology, remote sensing, spatial ecology, space-ecological modeling using open-source software, species distribution modeling, and theoretical ecology.

He is a member of the NASA group on Surface Biology and Geology (SBG).

== Biography ==
Rocchini was born in Siena on August 29, 1975. He completed his high school diploma in scientific studies in 1994. In 2000, at the University of Siena, his hometown, he earned a master's degree in Natural sciences.

In 2001, he attended a postgraduate course in "Geographic Information Systems and Thematic Cartography," organized by the Tuscany region and the University of Siena.

Subsequently, Rocchini won a PhD in "Sciences and Technologies Applied to the Environment" at the University of Siena, with a research project that investigated remote sensing and GIS techniques applied to the environment.

In 2002, he completed a postgraduate course in landscape analysis at the University of Naples Federico II.

He worked as a GIS analyst at the Istituto Geografico Militare (IGM) in Italy (2002–2003).

== Academic career ==
=== Postdoctoral training ===
He began his academic career in 2005 as a visiting researcher at the University of Bremen, continuing his training as a postdoc at the University of Siena. Under the guidance of Prof. Alessandro Chiarucci, he investigated quantitative methods for analyzing landscape diversity using remote sensing images.

=== Edmund Mach Foundation ===
From 2009, Rocchini worked at the IASMA Research and Innovation Centre, part of the Edmund Mach Foundation, where he explored modeling the interaction between ecological, environmental, and genetic factors. Later, as a tenure-track researcher (2011–2014), he deepened his work in GIS and remote sensing applied to ecology.

During the same period, Rocchini spent time researching at the University of Würzburg, contributing to the COST Action TD1202 "Mapping and the Citizen Sensor" project.

From 2009 to 2016, he worked at the Edmund Mach Foundation with Marcus Neteler in the working group for the development of the free software GRASS.

In 2015, in Trento, he was invited as a speaker, along with Annapaola Rizzoli, to discuss biodiversity in the Dolomites at a Tedx event.

=== Academic roles ===
In 2017, he became an associate professor at the University of Trento, holding this position until May 2019, when he was appointed honorary professor at the Czech University of Life Sciences Prague.

Also in 2019, he achieved the position of full professor at the Department of Biological, Geological, and Environmental Sciences at the University of Bologna.

He leads the BIOME lab group along with Alessandro Chiarucci, Roberto Cazzolla Gatti, and Juri Nascimbene.

== Associations ==
Throughout his career, Duccio Rocchini has collaborated extensively with various scientific associations, working in the field of biodiversity and Earth observation.

Among his appointments is his membership in the NASA Surface Biology and Geology (SBG) working group and his designation as an expert by the European Commission and the European Space Agency (ESA) in the field of biodiversity for the development of ESA's space program until 2030. This role involves a direct contribution to the development of strategies and technologies for monitoring and protecting Earth's biodiversity, using data and tools provided by the space program.

He is actively involved in several working groups of GEOBON(Group on Earth Observation Network) to understand the functioning and evolution of ecosystems and the impacts of such changes on ecosystem services provided to humanity. Additionally, he collaborates with the International Cooperative Programme on Assessment and Monitoring of Air Pollution Effects on Forests (ICP), which aims to monitor and assess the impact of air pollution on forests, a crucial aspect for the conservation of forest ecosystems and biodiversity.

He participates in the Biodiversity group and the Working Group on Information Systems and Services of the Committee on Earth Observation Satellites (CEOS), discussing remote sensing techniques and technologies for biodiversity conservation.

He is a member of the Global Mountain Biodiversity Assessment (GMBA) Research Network, managed by the University of Bern, with a specific focus on biodiversity in mountain environments, some of the most sensitive and at-risk ecosystems.

He also participates in the Working Group on Data Quality of the COST Action CA17134 – SENSECO, and the Working Group on Visualization of high-dimensional data of the COST Action Big Data Era in Sky and Earth Observation (BIG-SKYEARTH). Additionally, he is a member of the Task on Ecosystem Extent – CEOS.

He is engaged in organizing various international remote sensing conferences each year, such as Showcase 2022 (AGM) and EarthBridge 2023(EB).

== Awards and honors ==
During his career, he has received several international scientific recognitions, including:

- In 2014, his work "Uncertainty in ecosystem mapping by remote sensing", published in Computers & Geosciences, was awarded the Best Paper Award 2013.
- In 2014, Rocchini became an Honorary Member of the International Association for Mathematical Geosciences (IAMG).
- In 2011, he received the Earth and Space Foundation Award, becoming the first Italian researcher to receive this recognition.
- In 2023 he is in the top 0.173%, in the top 100,000 researchers in the world in all fields (out of 6 million).

== Private life ==
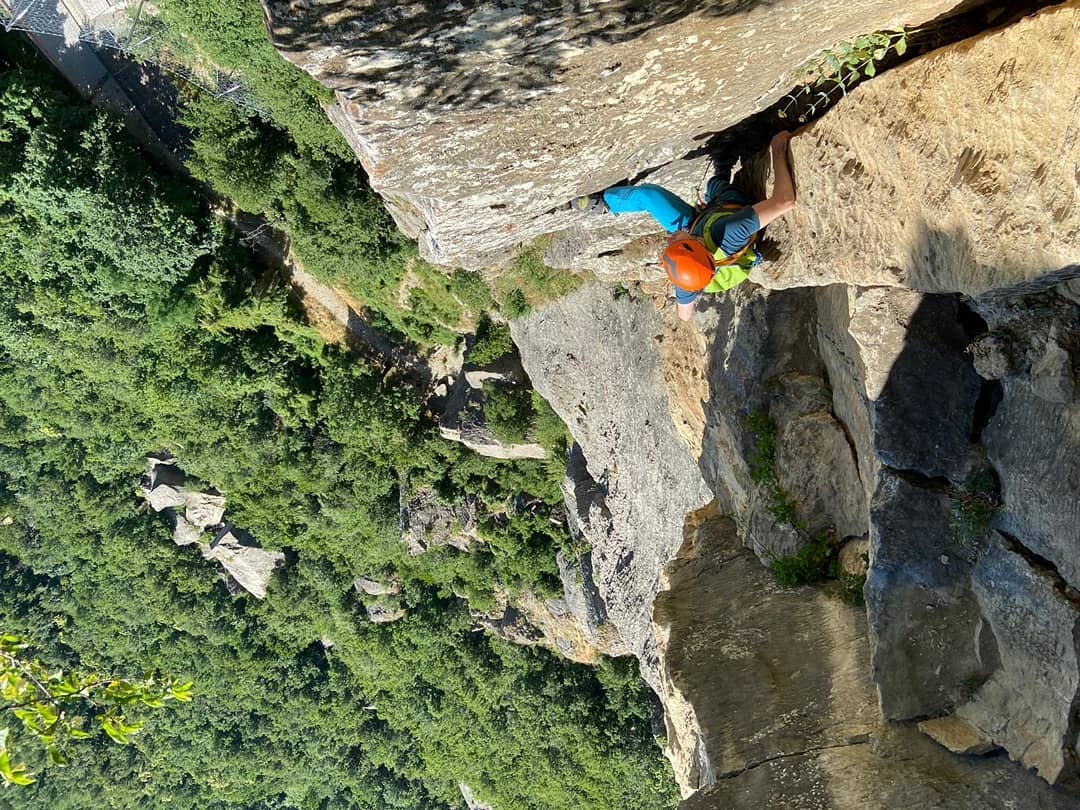
Duccio Rocchini while climbing.

Duccio Rocchini has always been passionate about sport climbing. In 2021 he created a climbing group for young university students called "ClimBIOME" (Climb+biome). Over time it has expanded more and more and in 2024 reaching almost 150 climbers and organizing excursions throughout Italy and Europe.

He studied guitar and regularly organises, even during international conferences, jam sessions where researchers playing some instrument can meet and play together.

He is part of the "Contrada Capitana dell'Onda" of the Siena Palio where he is actively present every year and an active contributor to the organization.

== Publications ==
=== Books ===
He has contributed to the writing of various scientific books, including:

- "Remote Sensing of Natural Resources," CRC Press, 580 pages, 2013.
- "Thematic Cartography for the Society," Springer, 357 pages, 2014.
- "Remote Sensing Handbook - Three Volume Set (1st ed.)," CRC Press, 2304 pages, 2015.
- "An Introduction to Spatial Data Analysis: Remote Sensing and GIS with Open Source Software," Pelagic Publishing LTD, 216 pages, 2020.
- "Remote Sensing of Plant Biodiversity," Springer, 518 pages, 2020

=== Scientific papers ===
He is the author of over 200 publications, among the most cited:

- Gillespie, Thomas W.; Foody, Giles M.; Rocchini, Duccio; et al. (2008). "Measuring and modelling biodiversity from space". Progress in Physical Geography: Earth and Environment. 32 (2): 203–221. Bibcode:2008PrPG...32..203G. doi:10.1177/0309133308093606. S2CID 17272668.
- Rocchini, Duccio; Hortal, Joaquín; et al. (2011). "Accounting for uncertainty when mapping species distributions: The need for maps of ignorance". Progress in Physical Geography: Earth and Environment. 35 (2): 211–226. Bibcode:2011PrPG...35..211R. doi:10.1177/0309133311399491. S2CID 17941488.
- Rocchini, Duccio; Balkenhol, Niko; Carter, Gregory A.; et al. (2010). "Remotely sensed spectral heterogeneity as a proxy of species diversity: Recent advances and open challenges". Ecological Informatics. 5 (5): 318–329. Bibcode:2010EcInf...5..318R. doi:10.1016/j.ecoinf.2010.06.001.
- He, Kate S.; Bradley, Bethany A.; Cord, Anna F.; Rocchini, Duccio; et al. (2015). "Will remote sensing shape the next generation of species distribution models?". Remote Sensing in Ecology and Conservation. 1 (1): 4–18. Bibcode:2015RSEC....1....4H. doi:10.1002/rse2.7. hdl:11572/198118.
- Geri, Francesco; Amici, Valerio; Rocchini, Duccio (2010). "Human activity impact on the heterogeneity of a Mediterranean landscape". Applied Geography. 30 (3): 370–379. Bibcode:2010AppGe..30..370G. doi:10.1016/j.apgeog.2009.10.006.
- Pettorelli, Nathalie; Wegmann, Martin; Skidmore, Andrew; et al. (2016). "Framing the concept of satellite remote sensing essential biodiversity variables: challenges and future directions". Remote Sensing in Ecology and Conservation. 2 (3): 122–131. Bibcode:2016RSEC....2..122P. doi:10.1002/rse2.15. hdl:11585/721200.
- Rocchini, Duccio (2007). "Effects of spatial and spectral resolution in estimating ecosystem α-diversity by satellite imagery". Remote Sensing of Environment. 111 (4): 423–434. Bibcode:2007RSEnv.111..423R. doi:10.1016/j.rse.2007.03.018.
- He, Kate S.; Rocchini, Duccio; et al. (2011). "Benefits of hyperspectral remote sensing for tracking plant invasions". Diversity and Distributions. 17 (3): 381–392. Bibcode:2011DivDi..17..381H. doi:10.1111/j.1472-4642.2011.00761.x. hdl:10449/24214.
- Zellweger, Florian; De Frenne, Pieter; Lenoir, Jonathan; Rocchini, Duccio; et al. (2019). "Advances in Microclimate Ecology Arising from Remote Sensing". Trends in Ecology & Evolution. 34 (4): 327–341. Bibcode:2019TEcoE..34..327Z. doi:10.1016/j.tree.2018.12.012. hdl:1854/LU-8588523. PMID 30651180.
- Nagendra, Harini; Rocchini, Duccio (2008). "High resolution satellite imagery for tropical biodiversity studies: the devil is in the detail". Biodiversity and Conservation. 17 (14): 3431–3442. Bibcode:2008BiCon..17.3431N. doi:10.1007/s10531-008-9479-0.
