= Virgilio Ducci =

Italian painter

Virgilio Ducci (27 October 1623 – year of death unknown) was an Italian painter of the Baroque period, mainly recalled for his work in his native Città di Castello.

He was born in Città di Castello, but as a youth apprenticed with Francesco Albani in Bologna.

After his training, he returned home. In the chapel of the Angel Guardian of the Duomo in Citta di Castello, he painted two canvases of the story of Tobias and the Angel. He also painted the lunettes over the arch of the chapel of San Francesco di Paola in the church of San Sebastiano. He likely died as a young man.
