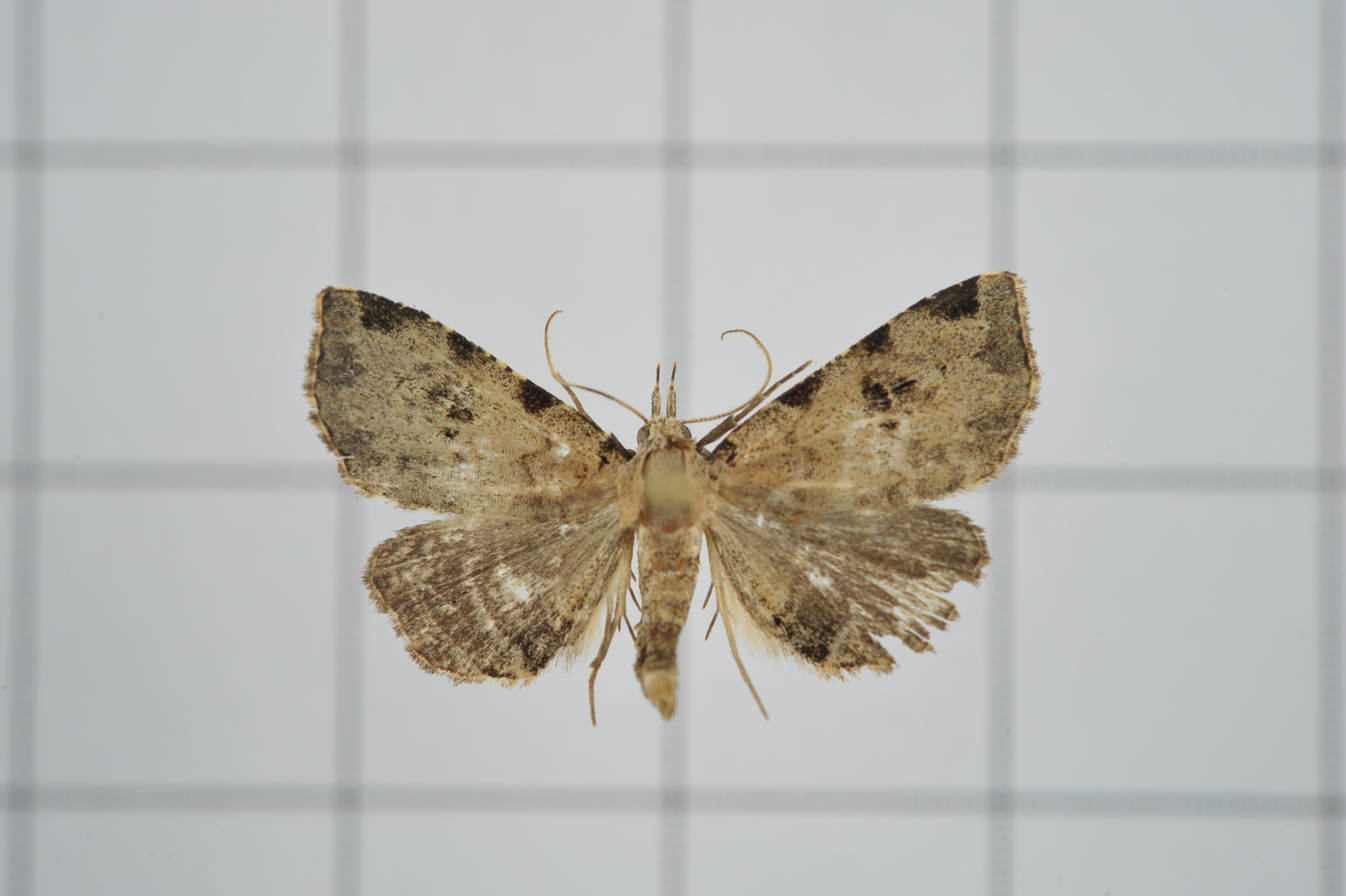
- Chusaris nigromaculata

Scientific classification
- Kingdom: Animalia
- Phylum: Arthropoda
- Class: Insecta
- Order: Lepidoptera
- Superfamily: Noctuoidea
- Family: Erebidae
- Subfamily: Calpinae
- Genus: Chusaris; Walker, [1859]

Synonyms
- Enea Walker, [1863]; Alelimminola Strand, 1919; Luceriola Strand, 1920

= Chusaris =

Genus of moths

Chusaris is a genus of moths of the family Erebidae. It was erected by Francis Walker in 1859.

== Description ==
Palpi long and porrect (extending forward), where the second joint fringed with scales above. Third joint slender and naked. Thorax smooth. Abdomen with a tuft on basal segment. Legs slender and naked. Forewings long and narrow with depressed and acute apex. Slight raised tufts found at middle and end of cell. Forewings with veins 6 and 7 arise from angle of cell and veins 8 to 10 stalked. Hindwings with veins 3 and 4 stalked and vein 5 from middle of discocellulars. Veins 6 and 7 stalked.

== Species ==
- Chusaris albilineata Holloway, 2008
- Chusaris albipunctalis Rothschild, 1915
- Chusaris bisinuata Hampson, 1898
- Chusaris compripalpis Strand, 1920
- Chusaris dinawa Bethune-Baker, 1908
- Chusaris dubiosa Strand, 1919
- Chusaris figurata (Moore, [1885])
- Chusaris griseisigna Holloway, 2008
- Chusaris idaeoides (Hampson, 1891)
- Chusaris indigna (Wileman & West, 1930)
- Chusaris indistincta (Rothschild, 1920)
- Chusaris maculalis Walker, [1866]
- Chusaris meterythrina Hampson, 1898
- Chusaris microlepidopteronis (Strand, 1920)
- Chusaris mulumaculata Holloway, 2008
- Chusaris nigrisigna Hampson, 1902
- Chusaris nigromaculata (Wileman, 1915)
- Chusaris obliquisignata Holloway, 2008
- Chusaris olearia Bethune-Baker, 1908
- Chusaris opisthospila Turner, 1909
- Chusaris bifasciata Holloway, 2008
- Chusaris paucimaculata (Hampson, 1893)
- Chusaris puncticilia (Hampson, 1891)
- Chusaris purpurisigna Holloway, 2008
- Chusaris renalis (Moore, 1882)
- Chusaris retatalis Walker, [1859]
- Chusaris retataloides Holloway, 2008
- Chusaris rhynchinodes Strand, 1915
- Chusaris roseolactea (Rothschild, 1915
- Chusaris setocircularis Holloway, 2008
- Chusaris signicosta (Walker, [1863])
- Chusaris sordida (Wileman & South, 1917)
- Chusaris venata Warren, 1914
- Chusaris violisigna Holloway, 2008
