= Samuel Valerio =

Grecian-Jewish author and physician

Samuel ben Judah Valerio (Hebrew: שמואל בן יהודה ווליריאו) was a Jewish physician and author who lived in the Grecian Archipelago in the second half of the sixteenth century. He wrote Yad ha-Melekh (completed in Corfu in 1579, published in Venice in 1586), a commentary on the Book of Esther, and Ḥazon la-Mo'ed (completed in a village near Patras in 1580, published in Venice in 1586), a philosophical commentary on the Book of Daniel. There is an extract from the latter commentary in the rabbinical Bible of Amsterdam (1724–27). Valerio wrote also Emeḳ ha-Bakha, Pi Ḥakham, and Bet ha-Malkhut, which remained in manuscript.
