= 609 Fulvia =

Main-belt asteroid

Discovery
- Discovered by: Max Wolf
- Discovery site: Heidelberg
- Discovery date: 24 September 1906

Designations
- Pronunciation: /ˈfʌlviə/
- Alternative designations: 1906 VF

Orbital characteristics
- Epoch 31 July 2016 (JD 2457600.5)
- Uncertainty parameter 0
- Observation arc: 109.58 yr (40025 d)
- Aphelion: 3.2129 AU (480.64 Gm)
- Perihelion: 2.9563 AU (442.26 Gm)
- Semi-major axis: 3.0846 AU (461.45 Gm)
- Eccentricity: 0.041601
- Orbital period (sidereal): 5.42 yr (1978.8 d)
- Mean anomaly: 175.151°
- Mean motion: 0° 10^{m} 54.948^{s} / day
- Inclination: 4.1887°
- Longitude of ascending node: 165.356°
- Argument of perihelion: 112.756°

Physical characteristics
- Mean radius: 27.085±1.4 km
- Synodic rotation period: 35.375 h (1.4740 d)
- Geometric albedo: 0.0602±0.007
- Absolute magnitude (H): 10.3

609 Fulvia is a minor planet orbiting the Sun.
