= Lapo =

Lapo may refer to:

== People ==
=== Surname ===
- Arnolfo di Lapo
- Yahor Lapo (born 1982), modern pentathlete from Belarus

=== Given name ===
- Lapo De Carlo (born 1968), Italian sports journalist and presenter
- Lapo Elkann (born 1977), Italian businessman
- Lapo Gianni (died after 1328), Italian poet
- Lapo Pistelli (born 1964), Italian politician
- Lapo da Castiglionchio (1316–1381)

== Other ==
- Lift Above Poverty Organization, Nigerian organisation
- Los Angeles Philharmonic Orchestra
