= Fulvia (wife of Saturninus) =

1st-century Roman convert to Judaism

Fulvia, the wife of Tiberius' 'amicus' Saturninus, lived during the reign of the Roman Emperor Tiberius. (She is sometimes confused with Fulvia the wife of Marcus Antonius who died before the Principate began.)

Fulvia converted to Judaism through the teachings of a Jew who had sought refuge in Rome to escape persecution. This impostor, together with three others, persuaded her to contribute purple and gold for the Temple at Jerusalem, which contributions they kept for themselves. The discovery of this fraud by the emperor Tiberius through his friend Saturninus, Fulvia's husband, caused the deportation of the Jews from Rome to Sardinia. (19 C.E.; Josephus, "Ant." xviii. 3, § 5; comp. Philo, "In Flaccum," § 1; idem, "Legatio ad Caium," § 24; Tacitus, "Annales," ii. 85; Suetonius, "Tiberius," § 36).
