= Basilica Fulvia =

Ancient Roman civic basilica in Rome

- Shown in ancient Rome
- Click on the map for a fullscreen view
- 41°53′33″N 12°29′10″E
- Type: Basilica

The Basilica Fulvia was a basilica in the Roman Forum. It was constructed in 179 BCE by the censors Marcus Aemilius Lepidus and Marcus Fulvius Nobilior, the latter of whom gave the basilica its name. It stood for over a century before Lucius Aemilius Paullus began construction of the Basilica Aemilia in 55 BCE, incorporating many architectural elements from the earlier structure. Today, only a fragment of the Basilica Fulvia’s foundation is visible beneath a protective canopy.

== History ==
Livy reports that in 179 BCE, the consuls Marcus Fulvius Nobilior and Marcus Aemilius Lepidus directed the construction of a new basilica behind the argentariae novae in the Forum. Varro records that a water clock was installed by Publius Cornelius Scipio Nasica Serapio in 159 BCE near the "Basilica Aemilia et Fulvia," marking the first textual reference to the basilica by that name. The contribution of the gens Aemilia to the basilica continued in 78 BCE when another consul named Marcus Aemilius Lepidus was reported by Pliny to have adorned the structure with shields. Roman coins from 61 BCE depict the two-storied basilica with circular ornamentation between two colonnaded registers, possibly representing the shields said to have been placed there by Marcus Aemilius Lepidus. However, Lawrence Richardson Jr. argued against identifying these coins with the Basilica Fulvia, due to the lack of tabernae in front, and the inconsistent roofline that, he believed, would have matched the Porticus Aemilia instead.

The basilica's foundations consisted of Grotta Oscura tuff upholding a travertine floor. A colonnade fronted the pre-existing tabernae and ran along the entire length of the southwest façade. The most groundbreaking architectural feature of the Basilica Fulvia was the enlargement of the central nave, which was supported by two rows of columns that created an unbroken and expansive interior plane. This stood in stark contrast to the hypostyle layout of the Greek stoai, on which the earliest Roman basilicas were modeled, where columns dominated the interior space. Today, only a portion of the foundations can be seen beneath a canopy to the northwest of the site.

== See also ==
- List of Roman basilicas

== Bibliography ==
- Bauer, Heinrich. "Basilica Fulvia." In Lexicon Topographicum Urbis Romae. Supplementum. I, Carta archeologica di Roma. Primo quadrante, edited by Eva Margareta Steinby. Edizioni Quasar, 2005. (In Italian)
- Coarelli, Filippo, et al. Rome and Environs: An Archaeological Guide. University of California Press, 2014.
- Richardson, Lawrence. "Basilica Fulvia, modo Aemilia." In Studies in Classical Art and Archaeology: A Tribute to Peter Heinrich von Blanckenhagen. Edited by Günter Kopcke and Mary B. Moore. J. J. Augustin Publisher, 1979.
- Perkins, John Bryan Ward. "Constantine and the Origins of the Christian Basilica." Papers of the British School at Rome 22 (1954): 69-90.
