= Maestri =

Maestri is a surname of Italian origin. Notable people with the surname include:

- Alex Maestri (born 1985), Italian baseball player
- Ambrogio Maestri (born 1970), Italian operatic baritone
- Anna Maestri (1924–1988), Italian actress
- Cesare Maestri (1929–2021), Italian mountaineer
- Cesare Maestri (runner) (born 1993), Italian runner
- Don Maestri (born 1946), American college basketball coach
- Flavio Maestri (born 1973), Peruvian soccer player
- George Maestri, creative director of Rubber Bug animation studio
- Guy Maestri (born 1974), Australian contemporary artist
- Luca Maestri (born 1963), chief financial officer at Apple Inc
- Hector Maestri (1935–2014), Cuban baseball player
- Michelangelo Maestri (died 1812), Italian artist
- Mirco Maestri (born 1991), Italian cyclist
- Pietro Maestri (1816–1871), Italian risorgimento-patriot
- Riccardo Maestri (born 1994), Italian swimmer
- Robert Maestri (1899–1974), mayor of New Orleans
- Ron Maestri, American college baseball coach
- Walter Maestri (died 2017), American sociologist, academic administrator, and emergency manager
- Yoann Maestri (born 1988), French rugby player
