= SS Flaminian =

Three steamships of the Ellerman & Papyanni Line were named Flaminian:

- SS Flaminian (1880), 2,131 GRT, sold 1901
- SS Flaminian (1914), 3,439 GRT, shelled and sunk in 1915
- SS Flaminian (1917), 3,227 GRT, scrapped 1950
