= Fulvio Flavoni =

Italian football goalkeeper

Personal information
- Date of birth: 25 January 1970 (age 56)
- Place of birth: Rome, Italy
- Height: 6 ft 3 in (1.91 m)
- Position: Goalkeeper

Youth career
- 1988–1989: Campobasso
- 1989–1990: Castel di Sangro

Senior career*
| Years | Team | Apps | (Gls) |
| 1990–1991 | Cesena | 0 | (0) |
| 1991–1992 | Russi | 13 | (0) |
| 1992–1994 | Gubbio | 65 | (52) |
| 1994–1995 | Fano | 34 | (27) |
| 1995–1996 | Frosinone | 2 | (1) |
| 1996–1997 | Gubbio | 0 | (0) |
| 1997–1998 | Torres | 7 | (10) |
| 1998–2000 | Lanciano | 52 | (33) |
| 2000–2003 | Cagliese | 49 | (34) |
| 2004–2005 | Fortis Spoleto | 0 | (0) |
| 2005–2007 | Valfabbrica | 0 | (0) |
| 2007–2008 | Fossombrone | 0 | (0) |
| 2008–2011 | Pergolese | | |
| 2011–2012 | Real Metauro | | |

Managerial career
- 2012–2013: Gubbio (GK coach)
- 2013–2014: Cuneo (assistant)
- 2014–2015: Paganese (assistant)
- 2015–2016: Castello (GK coach)
- 2017–2018: Matelica (U19 GK coach)
- 2018–2019: Ternana (GK coach)
- 2020–2021: Perugia (GK coach)
- 2021–2022: Juve Stabia (GK coach)
- 2022: Cesena (GK coach)
- * Club domestic league appearances and goals

Fulvio Flavoni (born 25 January 1970) is an Italian football coach and a former goalkeeper.

== Biography ==
He was born in Rome, Italy. He left his family at the young age of 15 to play on the junior Campobasso team in Serie B, which he moved from the Castel di Signo to win the interregionals. The next year, he was signed with Cesena, where he stayed to win the Viareggio tournament, although, according to Flavoni, "The experience arrived when I was too young to give the most of myself." After a short, successful stint with Russi, he goes back to the interregionals with Gubbio, and then to Fano in C2. At around this time, he was married to his current wife, Loredana, after having his daughter Benedetta out of wedlock. Flavoni went to several other teams, including Lanciano, which he was a part of when they were the best in Italy. He stays in the C championship for six years of his career, but when he finally leaves, he goes to Valfabbrica in Eccellenza. After the end of the two-year contract, he signed with FC Fossombrone.

== Honours ==
=== Club ===
A.C. Cesena

- Viareggio Tournament Champions: 1990

Lanciano

- Interregional Championship Winners: 1999

== See also ==
- The Cesena Roster
