= Domenico Casadei =

Italian engineer

Domenico Casadei from the Bologna University, Bologna, Italy, was named Fellow of the Institute of Electrical and Electronics Engineers (IEEE) in 2014 for contributions to direct torque control and matrix converters in electric drives.
