= Flaminio =

Flaminio may refer to:

== Geography ==
- Flaminio (Rome), a quartiere
- Flaminio – Piazza del Popolo (Rome Metro), an underground station
- Rignano Flaminio, a comune in the Metropolitan City of Rome
- Stadio Flaminio, a stadium in Rome

== Other ==
- Il Flaminio, a 1735 comic opera by Giovanni Battista Pergolesi
