= Carlo Manieri =

Italian painter

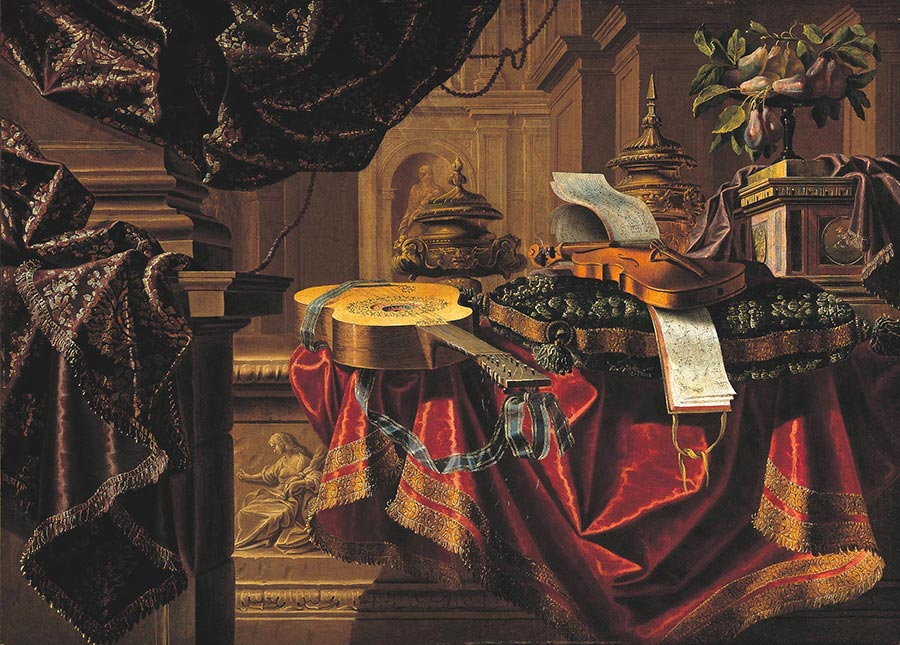
Ostentatious still life

Carlo Manieri (also known as Carlo Maniero and Carlo Maniere) (fl 1662–1700) was an Italian painter, active in Rome. He was a specialist still-life painter and is known for his still lifes of fruit and ostentatious still lifes depicting curtains, cushions, musical instruments, armor and other objects. His work formed a bridge between the archaic arrangements of Fioravanti and the new style of Christian Berentz.

== Life ==
Virtually nothing is known about Carlo Manieri. He is believed to have been originally from Taranto in southern Italy. His birth date must probably be placed in the late 1620s or the early 1630s as he already had two daughters in 1675 who were then referred to as 'spinsters'.

From the early 1660s he is recorded in Rome where he was admitted to the Congregazione dei Virtuosi at the Pantheon in 1662. The Congregazione consisted of eminent artists and sponsored art exhibits, presentations of poetry and literature, discussions, and visits to historic sites in Rome.

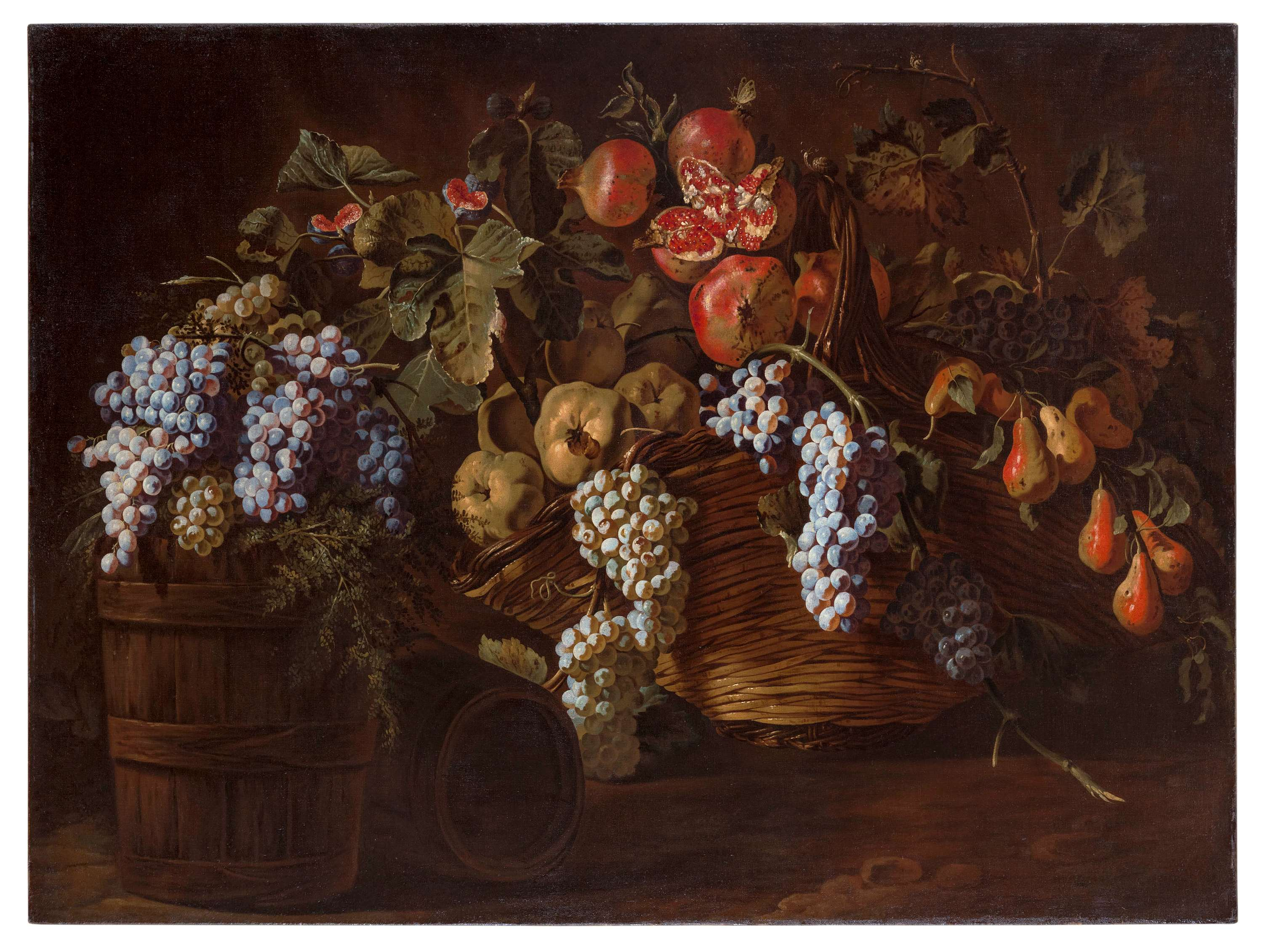
Still Life with Fruit

Manieri is recorded as living in the parish of San Lorenzo in Lucina until at least 1680.

It is not clear when he died but it must have been after 1700 when he was registered in the parish of Sant'Andrea del Fratte.

== Work ==
The artistic personality and oeuvre of Carlo Manieri have only recently been rediscovered and defined. Prior to the 1990s, Manieri's works were often confused with those of other, similar artists from the period, in particular Mariano Fetti, the Master of the Floridiana, 'SALV' and Francesco Noletti. Manieri played a central role in still life painting in the second half of the 17th century in Rome.

His work formed a bridge between the archaic arrangements of Fioravanti and the new style of Christian Berentz and inserted some motifs of Michelangelo del Campidoglio.

As the artist is rarely mentioned in contemporary archival documents, inventories and histories, his name and work remained unknown for a long time. His name appears only three times in the Roman inventories: the 1714 Colonna inventory lists six paintings by his hand, the 1725 Pamphili inventory two and the 1756 Valenti Gonzaga inventory also two. None of the paintings mentioned in these inventories appears to have survived in the collections.

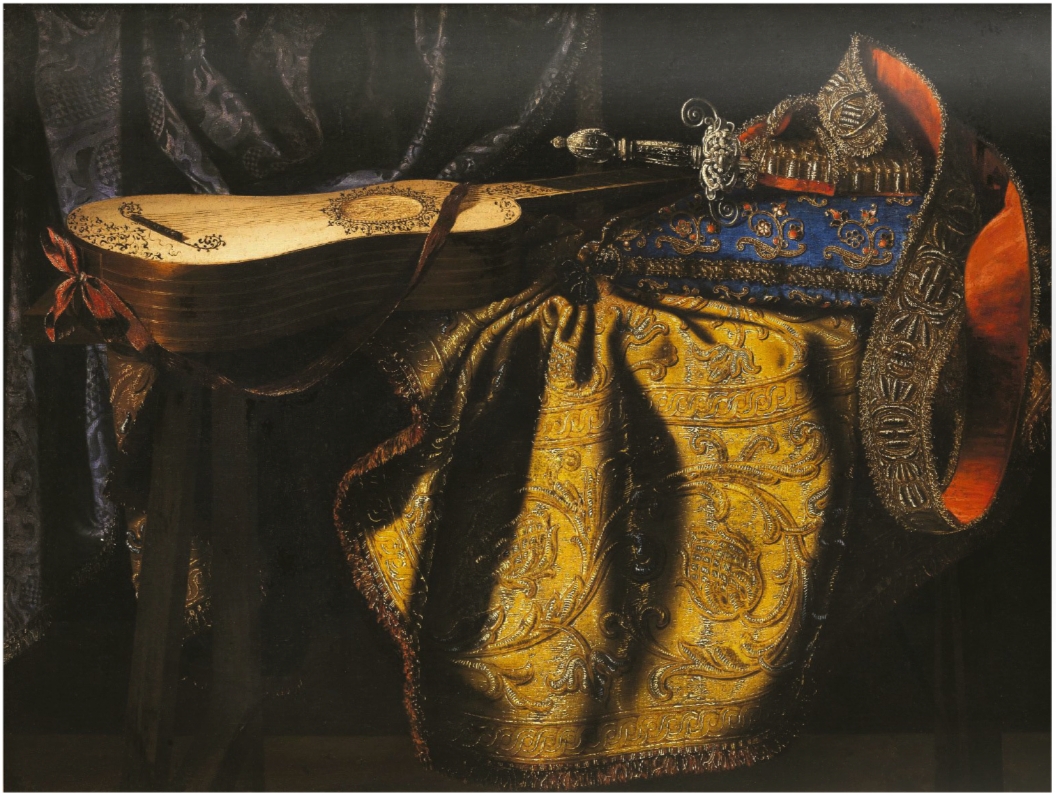
Still life with tapestry, pillow, guitar and sword

The most comprehensive overview of the artist's output is provided by the inventory of possessions of the merchant Pellegrino Peri compiled after Peri's death in 1699. This inventory mentioned 10 works of Manieri, which are described as 'rugs', 'fruits', 'flowers' and 'perspective views'. The inventory included two of Manieri's masterpieces that were destined to furnish the Palazzo Pamphilj in Piazza Navona.

Even while Manieri was not mentioned in any of the contemporary artists' biographies, the latest research has demonstrated that Manieri was quite a prolific still life painter in his time. He also kept an active studio.

Manieri's still lifes are characterized by their dark, rich palette and the inclusion of heavy brocaded draperies. His output globally falls into two categories: 'perspective' paintings of spaces featuring curtains, cushions, musical instruments, armor and other objects and more traditional still lifes of fruit. In his still lifes of fruit he arranged the fruit in bunches, bowls and strewn across heavily draped tables. Examples of these are two works in the Museo di Capodimonte in Naples.

His perspective still lifes typically included pilasters, arches, niches and bas-reliefs in the background. On the side he placed his typical still lifes with objects characterized by their inclusion of luxurious, coloured fabrics, edged and embroidered in gold, heavy curtains and silverware. The scenes were bathed in luminous reflections of light.

Gian Domenico Valentini was a follower of Manieri.
