= Ottavio =

Ottavio is the Italian form of Octavius. Its feminine given name version is Ottavia. Ottavio may refer to:

== Given name ==
- Ottavio Cinquanta, the President of the International Skating Union
- Ottavio Leoni, Italian painter
- Ottavio Piccolomini, (1599–1656), Italian nobleman and general
- Ottavio Rinuccini (1562–1621), Italian composer
- Ottavio Serena (1837–1914), Italian politician and judge

== Middle name ==
- Giuseppe Ottavio Pitoni (1657–1734), Italian composer

== Fictional characters ==
- Don Ottavio, a character in Mozart's opera Don Giovanni
- One of the male innamorati of the commedia
