= Gino Agnese =

Italian journalist, biographer and essayist (1936–2026)

- Born: 10 March 1936; Naples, Italy
- Died: 28 March 2026 (aged 90); Rome, Italy
- Occupations: Journalist, biographer, essayist

Gino Agnese (10 March 1936 – 28 March 2026) was an Italian journalist, biographer and essayist. He was the president of the Rome Quadriennale from 2002 to 2011. He wrote biographies of the painter and sculptor Umberto Boccioni as well as the poet and editor Filippo Tommaso Marinetti. Agnese died in Rome on 28 March 2026, at the age of 90.

== Selected works ==
- Agnese, Gino (2016). Umberto Boccioni. L'artista che sfidò il futuro. Monza: Johan & Levi. ISBN 9788860101761.
- Agnese, Gino (2025). Il colbacco di Boccioni. Un lungo filo russo. Soveria Mannelli: Rubbettino. ISBN 9788849883077.
