= Micol (given name) =

Micol is a given name. Notable people with the given name include:

- Micol Cattaneo (born 1982), Italian athlete
- Micol Cristini (born 1997), Italian figure skater
- Micol Di Segni (born 1973), Italian professional Mixed martial artist and Alternative model
- Micol Fontana (1913–2015), Italian stylist and entrepreneur
- Micol Hebron (born 1972), American interdisciplinary artist, curator, and associate professor at Chapman University,
- Micol Ostow (born 1976), American author, editor and educator

== See also ==
- Micol (disambiguation)
