= Paride =

Paride is a masculine Italian given name. Notable people with the name include:

- Paride Grillo (born 1982), Italian cyclist
- Paride Milianti (born 1934), Italian alpine skier
- Paride Suzzara Verdi (1826–1879), Italian patriot, journalist and politician
- Paride Taban (1936–2023), South Sudanese Roman Catholic bishop
- Paride Tumburus (1939–2015), Italian footballer

== See also ==
- Il Paride, a 1662 Italian opera
- Parides, a genus of swallowtail butterflies
