= Cristiana Proietti =

American fashion designer

- Born: Italy
- Citizenship: United States
- Occupation: Fashion designer
- Years active: 2004–present
- Era: 21st century
- Known for: Founder of "Cris" cashmere clothing line
- Notable work: Cashmere clothing line "Cris"
- Style: Contemporary and colorful cashmere fashion

Cristiana Proietti is a designer based in Los Angeles, creator of the cashmere clothing line "Cris".

== Biography ==
Proietti was born and raised in Italy, and moved to North America in the late 80's.

After working as the head designer and design director for many public companies such as bebe, Guess, and Arden B. In 2003, Proietti founded the now defunct agency Cristiana Proietti Design Studio (CPDS), a Los Angeles creative service created to service the fashion industry needs in the fashion industry. She decided to develop and distribute her own line of colorful contemporary and sexy cashmere clothing. She debuted in New York City at the Fashion Coterie in 2004 and financed her own designs and distribution for "Cris" starting fall 2004. Cris was distributed at Barneys, Saks Fifth Avenue and Neiman Marcus in the USA, and at Harvey Nichold and Brown in the United Kingdom.
