= D'Abruzzo =

D'Abruzzo is an Italian surname meaning "of Abruzzo". Notable people with this surname include the following:

- Alan Alda (born Alphonso D'Abruzzo, 1936), American actor
- Robert Alda (born Alphonso D'Abruzzo; 1914–1986), Italian-American actor
- Stephanie D'Abruzzo (born 1971), American actress and puppeteer

== See also ==
- Abruzzo (surname)
