= Flavia Seia Isaurica =

Business owner in 2nd century Italy

Flavia Seia Isaurica (floruit 115 - 141 CE) was an ancient Roman businesswoman.

She was the domina (owner) of six brick clay beds in Campania, of which she owned at least two alone, and employed at least sixteen foremen (officinatores). She was active in the brick industry from 115 CE until at least 141 CE. She is regarded as a significant example of a successful Roman businesswoman from her day and has been the subject of research.

Our knowledge of Flavia Seia Isaurica comes primarily from the information contained within the stamps used to mark bricks she produced.
