= Martinengo =

Martinengo may refer to:

== People ==
- Federico Martinengo (1889–1943), Italian flying ace and admiral
- Giulio Cesare Martinengo (c. 1564 – 1613), Italian composer
- Maria Maddalena Martinengo, (1687–1737), Italian Roman Catholic saint
- Serge Martinengo de Novack, French football manager

== Other uses ==
- Martinengo (Italy), a comune in the Province of Bergamo
- Pinacoteca Tosio Martinengo, an art museum in Brescia, Lombardy
- Martinengo Altarpiece, a 1516 painting by Lorenzo Lotto
