= Puglisi =

Puglisi (pronounced [puʎˈʎiːzi]) is an Italian surname, derived from pugghisi (pronounced [pʊɟˈɟiːsɪ]), the Sicilian language term to indicate someone from Apulia. Notable people with the surname include:

- Andy Puglisi, American boy who disappeared in 1976
- Gemma Puglisi, Italian-American author
- Leonardo Puglisi, Australian journalist
- Marcello Puglisi, Italian racing driver
- Onofrio Puglisi (d. 1679), Sicilian mathematician
- Pino Puglisi, Roman Catholic priest

== See also ==
- Pugliesi, another surname
