= Jackie Ducci =

- Education: Catholic University of America
- Occupations: Philanthropist dressage rider author
- Organizations: Human-Animal Alliance
- Website: jackieducci.com

Jackie Ducci is an American philanthropist, dressage rider, and author. She is the founder of The Human-Animal Alliance, a 501(c)(3) nonprofit organization based in Wellington, Florida, and the author of Almost Hired: What's Really Standing Between You and the Job You Want (2018).

As a dressage rider, Ducci holds the United States Dressage Federation (USDF) Gold, Silver, and Bronze medals and competes at the FEI level.

== Early life and education ==
Ducci is based in Wellington, Florida and is a graduate of the Catholic University of America.

== Career ==
Ducci is the founder of Human-Animal Alliance, a non-profit organization based in Florida. Previously, Ducci founded Ducci & Associates, a firm based in Harford and Washington, D.C.

As a writer, Ducci wrote Almost Hired, that was published in 2018. It has been reviewed by multiple publications. The book's success spawned a two-season podcast of the same name.

Ducci has frequently appeared on various television, radio, and podcast programs at both local and national levels.

As a dressage rider, Ducci has received rider awards from the United States Dressage Federation for Grand Prix and Prix St. Georges. She holds USDF Gold, Silver, and Bronze medals, actively competing at the FEI level.

== Bibliography ==
- Almost Hired: What's Really Standing Between You and the Job You Want (2019)

== Awards and recognition ==
- 2019: USDF Rider Award for First, Second, and Third Levels
- 2021: USDF Rider Award for Prix St. Georges
- 2023: USDF Rider Award for Grand Prix Challenge
