= Cinzia Tani =

Italian writer, TV presenter and radio host

Cinzia Tani (5 September 1958 in Rome) is an Italian writer, television presenter and radio host. Tani received the Order of Merit of the Italian Republic from the Italian president in 2004.

== Biography ==
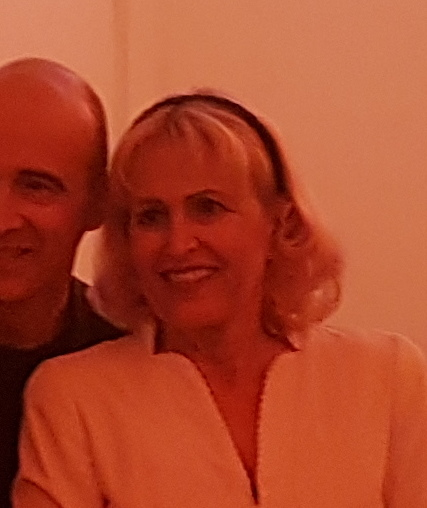

Tani debuted as a writer in 1987, with the publication of Dreaming California, which won the Scanno Prize. That same year he started working on the RAI, as correspondent of the program Mixer, hosted by Giovanni Minoli. Since 1991, Tani was the author and presenter of Who's Scene, The Eye on Cinema, and "Coffee." In 1997, Tani was presenter and author with Giordano Bruno Guerri. Since 2008, she has been the author of the comic "Special Unit" for Eura Editoriale.

She has alternated conducting television and radio programs, as Rewind – Private Visions and Fantastically (broadcast on Radio Rai), writing and dissemination. She has collaborated on several episodes of the television program Crimes about incidents of crime occurred in Italy since World War II.

== Publications ==
- The Muretto Tile
- California dreaming, (Marsilio, 1987)
- Premiopoli (Mondadori, 1987)
- The months blue, (Marsilio, 1991)
- Fantastic mind: fears and obsessions of the Italians, (New Eri, 1995)
- From Russia to Russia (Longanesi), 1997
- Killer (four centuries of crimes feminine)[3] (Mondadori, 1998)
- Couples killer (Mondadori, 2000)
- Black London, (Mondadori, 2001)
- Flirting at the crossroads, (Warner Books, 2002)
- Cruel love, (Mondadori, 2003
- The secrets of women (Sperling & Kupfer, 2004)
- The insomniac, (Mondadori, 2005)
- Red (Giulio Perrone Editore, 2006)
- Sun and shade, (Mondadori, 2007)
- The Good Wife, (Piemme, 2008)
- Panic, (Mondadori, 2008)
- The wonder of the world, (Mondadori, 2009)
- Anger, (Mondadori, 2009)
- Best friend, (Piemme, 2009)
- Apple, (Gallucci, 2010)
- Charleston, (Mondadori, 2010)
- I am a murderer, (Mondadori, 2011)
- Hold me, (Piemme, 2011)
- Kiss of Dionea, (Mondadori, 2012)
- My forever, (Mondadori, 2013)
- The story of Tonia, (Mondadori, 2014)
- Dangerous Women, (Rizzoli, 2015)

== Honors ==
On 8 March 2004, Tani received a knighthood in the Order of Merit of the Italian Republic in Rome from the Italian president, Carlo Azeglio Ciampi.
