= Lynne Abruzzo =

American science researcher

Lynne V. Abruzzo
- Education: Baylor College of Medicine, National Institute of Diabetes, Digestive, and Kidney Diseases, National Cancer Institute, University of Chicago
- Medical career
- Profession: Medicine
- Field: Pathology
- Institutions: The Ohio State University
- Sub-specialties: Cytogenetics

Lynne V. Abruzzo is an American scientist, pathologist, and researcher. As of 2017, she was at Ohio State University and an elected fellow of the American Association for the Advancement of Science.

== Life ==
Abruzzo received a Ph.D. in pathology in 1984 and an M.D. with honors in 1986 from the University of Chicago. Abruzzo completed postdoctoral fellowships in hematopathology at the National Cancer Institute, NIH; in molecular biology at the National Institute of Diabetes Digestive, and Kidney Diseases, NIH; and in clinical cytogenetics at Baylor College of Medicine.

Research Background

In 2018, Lynne Abruzzo and some of her colleagues identified biological pathways in chronic lymphocytic leukemia (CLL) patients that also had a genetic disorder called Trisomy 12. Trisomy 12 is a mutation where a cell has 3 copies of chromosome 12 instead of 2 normal pairs. There are a few different types of Trisomy 12 include full, mosaic, partial, and CLL. Full Trisomy 12 is where every cell has a mutation with 3 copies of the chromosome. This usually results in a miscarriage of the affected fetus during pregnancy. Mosaic Trisomy 12 which is a mix of some normal cells and some abnormal cells. This can have different effects based on the severity, but usually results in developmental/growth delays, craniofacial defects, and organ abnormalities. Partial Trisomy 12 is where an extra piece of chromosome 12 is duplicated, instead of a full extra chromosome. It can result in marcocephaly (large head), intellectual disability, birth defects, epilepsy, growth delays, etc.. Abruzzo's studies focused in on adults with Trisomy 12 and chronic lymphocytic leukemia. CLL is linked to Trisomy 12 because Trisomy 12 causes atypical cell shape, higher cell growth rates, and genetic markers. The research Abruzzo conducted analyzed samples from 147 patients (that were previously untreated). The research team identified the NFAT signaling pathway and the immune-regulating molecule CD73 as a potential target for future treatments.
