= Fulvia Michela Caligiuri =

Italian politician

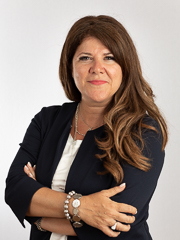
Fulvia Michela Caliguri in 2019.

Fulvia Michela Caligiuri (born 1 July 1973) is an Italian politician from Forza Italia who was elected to the Italian Senate in 2018.

== Political career ==
She was a candidate in the 2019 European Parliament election in Southern Italy and received 20,369 first preference votes.

She joined the Italian Parliament on 31 July 2019 when she replaced Matteo Salvini.
