= Cinzia Pellin =

Italian painter and set designer

Cinzia Pellin (born 19 July 1973 in Velletri, Rome) is a contemporary Italian painter and set designer.

== Art career ==
The women in Pellin's works include TV, film stars and, often, fashion models. Pellin also includes other women who he believes embody femininity, sensuality, or perseverance.

The detail of some glances painted on oversize canvases lets her suspended between the sweetness and violence of the contradictions of the time we are living. She has recently developed two new concepts. In the first, the face fades out thanks to play of shades, where it is only the eyes or the eyes and lips to stand out with bodily arrogance. In the second, she has tried to develop a technique between painting and drawing, with signs of grease pencil on oil paints.

== Artistry ==
Pellin's artistry is best expressed in these words, Cinzia Pellin from some time, is going on a course tending to analyze more and more closer the female universe: a way of inner temper, a kaleidoscope full of charm and enticement, a planet dissected in a myriad of splinters, that get near and far, in the endless play of existence. (L. Guarino)

== Solo exhibitions ==
- Launch of the second show scheduled for Ferrara stage ALIENS July 2014, House of Ludovico Ariosto
- Summer in Ferrara's license plate ALIENS - the alienating forms of contemporary June 2014, House of Ludovico Ariosto
