= Fulvia Miani Perotti =

- Fulvia dei conti Miani
- Born: 25 February 1844; Polignano a Mare
- Died: 25 February 1931 (aged 87); Cassano delle Murge
- Occupations: poet and benefactor
- Spouse: Gaetano Perotti
- Children: Armando Perotti
- Writing career
- Pen name: Voluntas
- Language: Italian
- Period: Romantic

Fulvia Miani Perotti (25 February 1844 – 25 February 1931) was an Italian writer who lived in the Apulia region of Italy.

== Life ==
She was the daughter of Count Nicola Miani, a lawyer and member of the Parliament, and of Ruffina Volpe. As a liberal-spirited woman, she wrote for a number of magazines and newspapers under the pen name Voluntas, meaning "willingness".

Throughout her life, she devoted herself to charitable endeavours, including the establishment of the first professional school for girls in southern Italy, created for the daughters of sailors in Bari. She was President of Catholic Associations, of the Daughters of Charity of Saint Vincent de Paul, as well as director of the Italian Red Cross, and during the 1915-1918 war she was President of the Civil Assistance Committee that worked to provide assistance to soldiers and their families.

In 1871, she became a friend of Giuseppe Mazzini and went to visit him in the fortress of Gaeta, where he was being held as a political prisoner. Fourteen letters document the continued interaction between Mazzini and Fulvia Miani Perotti, who had become his friend and benefactor. When Mazzini went into exile, Fulvia and her husband Gaetano Perotti (a Piedmontese officer in the army of the Kingdom of Italy) remained faithful to Mazzini by refusing to give information to governmental agents, which resulted in the end of Perotti's army career.

== Works ==
- Perotti dei Miani, Fulvia (1888). Relazione della Presidente delle Dame di Carità in Bari letta nella generale adunanza del 20 gennaio 1888 [Report by the President of the Daughters of Charity in Bari, read at the general meeting of 20 January 1888] (in Italian) (1 ed.). Trani: Valdemaro Vecchi.
- Voluntas (1881). Profili e paesaggi [Profiles and landscapes] (in Italian) (1 ed.). Trani: V. Vecchi e C.
- Voluntas (2015). Narracci, Giovanni (ed.). Sul colle incantato [On the enchanted hill] (in Italian) (1 ed.). Fasano: Schena.

== Legacy ==
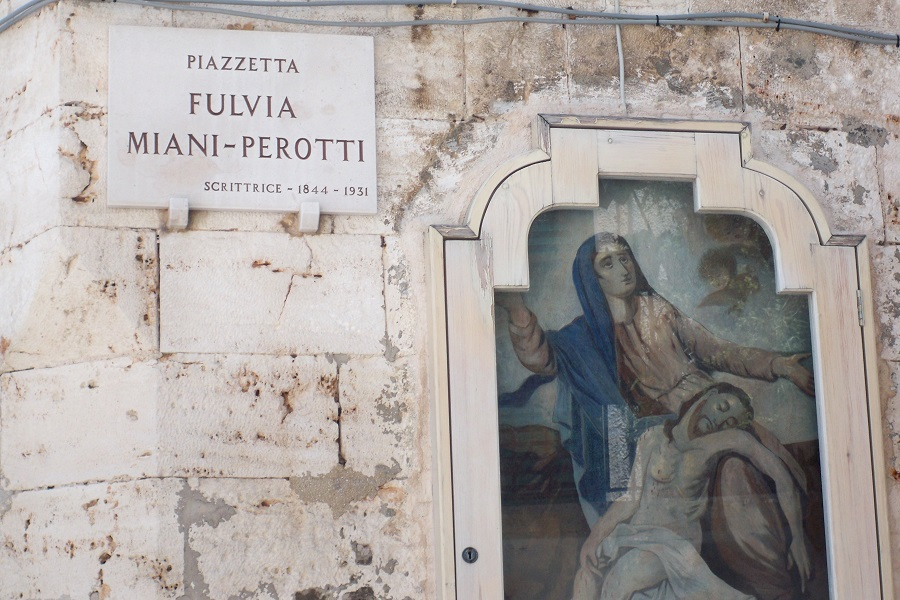
The name plate of the town square in Polignano a Mare

Fulvia's son, Armando Perotti, was perhaps Apulia's greatest poet. The municipal library of Cassano delle Murge is named after him. An old town square in Polignano a Mare, where the family's nobiliary house (and Fulvia's birthplace) stands, was renamed after her.
