= Antonio Catalani (Romano) =

Italian painter

Antonio Catalani (also called Il Romano) (c. 1596 – 1666 ) was an Italian painter of the late-Renaissance and early-Baroque periods. He might have been the same person as the painter Antonio Catalano (il giovane) of whom is said that he was born in Messina in 1583/1585 and died there in 1666.

He was born in Bologna. He was a pupil of Francesco Albani. He painted several pictures for the churches at Bologna, although he was more employed on cabinet pictures for the private collections. He painted the patron Saints of the city in four niches for the church of La Madonna del Grado in Bologna, and a St. Peter healing the Lame at the Gate of the Temple for the Gesu.
