= Ambra Senatore =

Italian choreographer, researcher and educator

Ambra Senatore (born 1976) is an Italian choreographer, researcher and educator at the University of Milan. In 2015, she was named director of the Centre Chorégraphique National de Nantes.

She was born in Turin. In 2004, she completed a doctorate in contemporary dance. She has trained with various choreographers including Carolyn Carlson, Dominique Dupuy and Bill T. Jones. In 2012, she established a dance company EDA based in Besançon. She lectures on the history of dance at the University of Milan. In 2007, she published La danza d’autore, vent’anni di danza contemporanea in Italia.

Senatore has worked with Jean-Claude Gallotta, Giorgio Rossi, Georges Lavaudant and Antonio Tagliarini.

In 2013, she choreographed and produced Nos amours bêtes, based on a script by Fabrice Melquiot. In 2018, she developed choreography for dances performed in the opera Cendrillon by Jules Massenet.

== Choreographed works ==
- Merce
- Passo (2010), was awarded the Premio Equilibrio by the Fondazione Musica per Roma
- A Posto (2011)
- John (2012)
- Aringa Rossa (2014)
- Quante Storie (2016)
