= Catalano =

Catalano is an Italian surname, originally an adjective or derived substantive indicating something or someone Catalan or from Catalonia, (Note: Catalano is also the name for the Catalan language, in Italian) can refer to the following persons:

- Amy Catalano (born 1972), American stock car racing driver
- Eduardo Catalano, Argentinian architect and sculptor
- Elisabetta Catalano, Italian photographer
- Nick Catalano, American author
- Pasquale Catalano (born 1971), Italian football player and manager
- Patti Catalano, American long-distance runner
- Tom Catalano, American record producer
- Armando Catalano, birth name of Guy Williams (actor)
