= Valentino (given name) =

- Pronunciation: Russian: [vəlʲɪnʲˈtʲinə] Italian: [valenˈtiːno]
- Gender: Male

Origin
- Origin: Latin nomen Valentinus
- Meaning: healthy, strong

Other names
- Related names: Valentinus, Valentin, Valentine

Valentino is an Italian male given name, the masculine equivalent of the female given name Valentina. It may be abbreviated as "Vale" or "Tino". The equivalent English male given name is Valentine. A surname, Valentino, also exists.

People named Valentino include:

== Given names ==
- Valentino Acuña (born 2006), Argentine footballer
- Valentino Ambrosio (born 2000), American football player
- Valentino Argento (1901–1941), Italian Olympic fencer
- Valentino d'Apreja (died 1539), Italian Roman Catholic bishop
- Valentino Babini (1889–1952), Italian general
- Valentino Balboni (born 1959), Italian test driver for Lamborghini
- Valentino Baldi (1774–1816), Italian painter
- Valentino Panciera Besarel (1829–1902), Italian sculptor
- Valentino Bellucci (born 1975), Italian philosopher
- Valentino Bertolini (1917–1967), Italian Olympic racewalker
- Valentino Blake (born 1990), U.S. American football player
- Valentino Bocca (born 2002/2003), Italian child who was the centre of an Italian court case where the court ruled that MMR vaccination caused autism
- Valentino Bompiani (1898–1992), Italian writer
- Valentino Bong (born 1989), Malaysian squash player
- Valentino Borgia (1914–2004), Italian Olympic Graeco-Roman wrestler
- Valentino Braitenberg (1926–2011), Italian cyberneticist
- Valentino Bucchi (1916–1976), Italian composer
- Valentino Castellani (born 1940), Italian politician
- Valentino Degani (1905–1974), Italian soccer player
- Valentino Achak Deng, Sudanese child refugee to the United States
- Valentino Fattore (born 2001), Argentine footballer
- Valentino Fioravanti (1764–1837), Italian composer
- Valentino Fois (1973–2008), Italian cyclist
- Valentino Furlanetto (born 1965), Italian motorcycle speedway rider
- Valentino Gallo (born 1985), Italian water polo player
- Valentino Garavani (1932–2026; frequently known mononymously as "Valentino"), Italian fashion designer
- Valentino Gasparella (born 1935), Italian track cyclist
- Valentino Giambelli (1928–2019), Italian soccer player
- Valentino Grant (born 1964), Italian politician
- Valentino Kanzyani, Slovenian DJ and music producer
- Valentino Khan (born 1987), U.S. DJ and music producer
- Valentino Knowles (born 1988), Bahamian boxer
- Valentino Lai (born 1985), Italian-Swede soccer player
- Valentino Lazaro (born 1996), Austrian soccer player
- Valentino Lanús (born 1975), Mexican actor
- Valentino Francisco Livramento (born 2002), British soccer player
- Valentino Macchi (1937–2013), Italian actor
- Valentino Manfredonia (born 1989), Brazilian-Italian boxer
- Valentino Mapapalangi (born 1993), Tongan rugby player
- Valentino Mario Maurizio Moris (1860–1944), Italian general, politician, aviation pioneer
- Valentino Mastrozzi (1729–1809), Italian Roman Catholic cardinal
- Valentino Mazzia (1922–1999), U.S. anesthesiologist, medical doctor and forensic doctor
- Valentino Mazzola (1919–1949), Italian soccer player
- Valentino Miller (also known mononymously as "Valentino"), U.S rapper
- Valentino Mokiwa (born 1954), Tanzanian Anglican archbishop
- Valentino Müller (born 1999), Austrian soccer player
- Valentino Murataj (born 1996), Albanian soccer player
- Valentino Musetti (born 1943), Italian-British stuntman
- Valentino Nucci, U.S. mafioso, member of the Gambino crime family
- Valentino Orsini (1927–2001), Italian director
- Valentino Orsolini Cencelli (1898–1971), Italian politician
- Valentino Pascucci (born 1978), U.S. baseball player
- Valentino Annibale Pastore (1868–1956), Italian philosopher
- Valentino Pellarini (1919–1972), Italian Olympic basketball player
- Valentino Piacentini (born 1978), Italian pingpong player
- Valentino Picone (born 1971), Italian comedian
- Valentino Pittoni (1872–1933), Italian politician
- Valentino Pozzoli, Italian astronomer
- Valentino Puccio (1965–2011), U.S. pro-wrestler
- Valentino Pugliese (born 1997), Swiss soccer player
- Valentino Ravnić (born 1995), Croatian soccer player
- Valentino Rossi (born 1979), Italian MotoGP motorcycle racer, nine-time world champion
- Valentino Rovisi (1715—1783), Italian painter
- Valentino Sala (1908—2002), Italian soccer player
- Valentino Siani (1595–1672), Italian violinmaker
- Valentino Stepčić (born 1990), Croatian soccer player
- Valentino Talluto, Italian convicted for multiple criminal transmissions of HIV
- Valentino Telaubun (born 1984), Indonesian soccer player
- Valentino Tontodonati (born 1959), Italian rower
- Valentino Riroroko Tuki (1932—2017), Rapa Nuian pretender to the throne
- Valentino Urbani (1690–1722), Italian alto castrato singer
- Valentino Valentini (bishop) (died 1593), Italian Roman Catholic bishop
- Valentino Vermeulen (born 2001), Dutch soccer player
- Valentino Vujinović (born 1999), German soccer player
- Valentino Yuel (born 1994), South Sudanese soccer player
- Valentino Zeichen (1938—2016), Italian poet
- Valentino Zucchetti, ballet dancer

== Pseudonymed ==
- Valentino, the stage name for Peter González Torres of the Puerto Rican band Magnate & Valentino
- Duke of Valentino, mononymously called "Valentino"
  - Cesare Borgia (1475–1507), Spanish-Italian soldier, nobleman, politician, and cardinal

== Fictional characters ==
- Valentino, a fictional character from the Argentine-Colombian Spanish-language telenovela Valentino el argentino
- Valentino, a fictional character from the A24 and Amazon Prime Video adult animated series Hazbin Hotel
- Valentino, a fictional character from the animated film Wish
- Valentino Calavera, a main character in Cartoon Network animated series Victor and Valentino

== See also ==
- Valentinos (Greek: Βαλεντίνος), Greek male given name
- Valentino (disambiguation)
- Valentina (disambiguation)
- Valentine (disambiguation)
- Valentini (disambiguation)
- Valentin (disambiguation)
- Vale (disambiguation)
- Tino (disambiguation)
