= Valentin =

- Pronunciation: French: [valɑ̃tɛ̃] German: [ˈvaləntiːn] Romanian: [valenˈtin] Spanish: [balenˈtin]
- Gender: male

Origin
- Origin: Latin nomen Valentinus

Other names
- Related names: Valentine, Valentín, Valentinus, Valentino, Bálint

Valentin is a male given name meaning "strong, healthy, power, rule". It comes from the Latin name Valentinus, as in Saint Valentin. Commonly found in Argentina, Bulgaria, France, Germany, Italy, Romania, Russia, Scandinavia, Ukraine, Latin America, Spain and Croatia. Valentin is also used as a surname in Spanish and German speaking-countries.

== Given name ==
=== First name ===
- Valentin Abel (born 1991), German politician
- Valentin Alexandru (born 1991), Romanian footballer
- Valentín Alsina (1802–1869), Argentine statesman
- Valentín Barco (born 2004), Argentine footballer
- Valentín Bettiga (born 1999), Argentine basketball player
- Valentin Blass (born 1995), German basketball player
- Valentin Barbero (born 2000), Argentine footballer
- Valentin Bondarenko (1937–1961), Soviet fighter pilot
- Valentin de Boulogne (before 1591 – 1632), French painter
- Valentín Burgoa (born 2000), Argentine footballer
- Valentin Brunel (born 1996), French DJ known as Kungs
- Valentin "Val" Brunn (born 1994), German electronic music producer and DJ known as Virtual Riot
- Valentin Bosioc (born 1983), Romanian bodybuilder
- Valentín Carboni (born 2005), Argentine footballer
- Valentín Castellanos (born 1998), Argentine footballer
- Valentin Ceaușescu (born 1948), Romanian physicist
- Valentin Chmerkovskiy (born 1986), Ukrainian–American ballroom dancer
- Valentin Coșereanu (born 1991), Romanian footballer
- Valentin Crețu (disambiguation), several people
- Valentin Demidov (born 1976), Russian politician
- Valentín Depietri (born 2000), Argentine footballer
- Valentín Díaz (1845–1916), Filipino patriot
- Valentin Dikul (born 1948), Russian circus artist
- Valentin Dzhavelkov (born 1968), Bulgarian Olympic pentathlete
- Valentín Elizalde (1979–2006), Mexican singer
- Valentin Eysseric (born 1992), French footballer
- Valentin Fernández Coria (1886–1954), Argentine chess player
- Valentin Foubert (born 2002), French ski jumper
- Valentin Friedland (1490–1556), German scholar
- Valentin Gaft (1935–2020), Russian actor
- Valentin Gapontsev (1939–2021), Russian–American billionaire
- Valentin Gasc (born 2000), Argentine footballer
- Valentin Gheorghe (born 1997), Romanian footballer
- Valentin Gjokaj (born 1993), Albanian footballer
- Valentin Glushko (1908–1989), Soviet rocket engineer
- Valentín Gómez (born 2003), Argentine footballer
- Valentin Grubeck (born 1995), Austrian footballer
- Valentín Haberkon (born 1995), Argentine footballer
- Valentin Haussmann (died c. 1611), German composer
- Valentin Inzko (born 1949), Austrian diplomat
- Valentin Ivanov (disambiguation), several people
- Valentín Larralde (born 2000), Argentine footballer
- Valentin Luz (born 1995), German pararower
- Valentin Madouas (born 1996), French cyclist
- Valentín Mancini (born 2003), Argentine footballer
- Valentin Mogilny (1965–2015), Soviet artistic gymnast
- Valentin-Yves Mudimbe (1941–2025), Congolese philosopher, professor, and author
- Valentin Nikolayev (disambiguation), several people
- Valentin Olenik (1939–1987), Russian Olympic wrestler
- Valentín Otondo (born 1999), Argentine footballer
- Valentin Parnakh (1891–1951), Russian jazz musician
- Valentín Perales (born 1995), Argentine footballer
- Valentín Perrone (born 2007), Argentine motorcycle racer
- Valentin Plătăreanu (1936–2019), Romanian actor
- Valentin Poénaru (born 1932), Romanian–French mathematician
- Valentin Prades (born 1992), French Olympic pentathlete
- Valentin Purosalo (born 2005), Finnish footballer
- Valentin Rapp (born 1992), German squash player
- Valentin Roberge (born 1987), French footballer
- Valentin Rose (disambiguation), several people
- Valentin Rosier (born 1996), French footballer
- Valentin Sabella (born 1999), Argentine footballer
- Valentin Sanon (born 1980), Ivorian tennis player
- Valentin Sarov (born 1976), Bulgarian–Qatari weightlifter
- Valentin Senn (born 2000), Austrian-American football player
- Valentin Serov (1865–1911), Russian painter
- Valentin Shashin (1916–1977), Soviet politician
- Valentin Stocker (born 1989), Swiss footballer
- Valentin Strukov (born 1953), Estonian politician
- Valentin Teodosiu (born 1953), Romanian actor
- Valentín Trujillo (actor) (1951–2006), Mexican actor, writer and director
- Valentín Umeres (born 2003), Argentine footballer
- Valentín Vada (born 1996), Argentine footballer
- Valentín Vergara (1879-1930), Argentine lawyer and politician
- Valentín Viola (born 1991), Argentine footballer
- Valentin Vodnik (1758–1819), Slovenian intellectual, linguist, poet, journalist and editor
- Valentin Yordanov (born 1960), Bulgarian Olympic wrestler

=== Middle name ===
- Charles-Valentin Alkan (1813–1888), French-Jewish composer and pianist
- Franco Valentín Flores (born 1993), Argentine footballer
- Hans-Valentin Hube (1890–1944), German Wehrmacht general

== Surname ==
- Bobby Valentín (born 1941), "El Rey del Bajo" (King of the Bass)
- Dave Valentin (1952–2017), American Latin jazz flautist
- Gabriel Valentin (1810–1883), German physiologist and academic
- Isabelle Valentin (born 1962), French politician
- Karl Valentin (1882–1948), German comedian, author and film producer
- Rodolfo Valentin (born 1944), Argentine hairdresser

== See also ==
- Valentinus (disambiguation)
- Valentine (disambiguation)
- Valentino (disambiguation)
- Valentim
