= Valentine (name) =

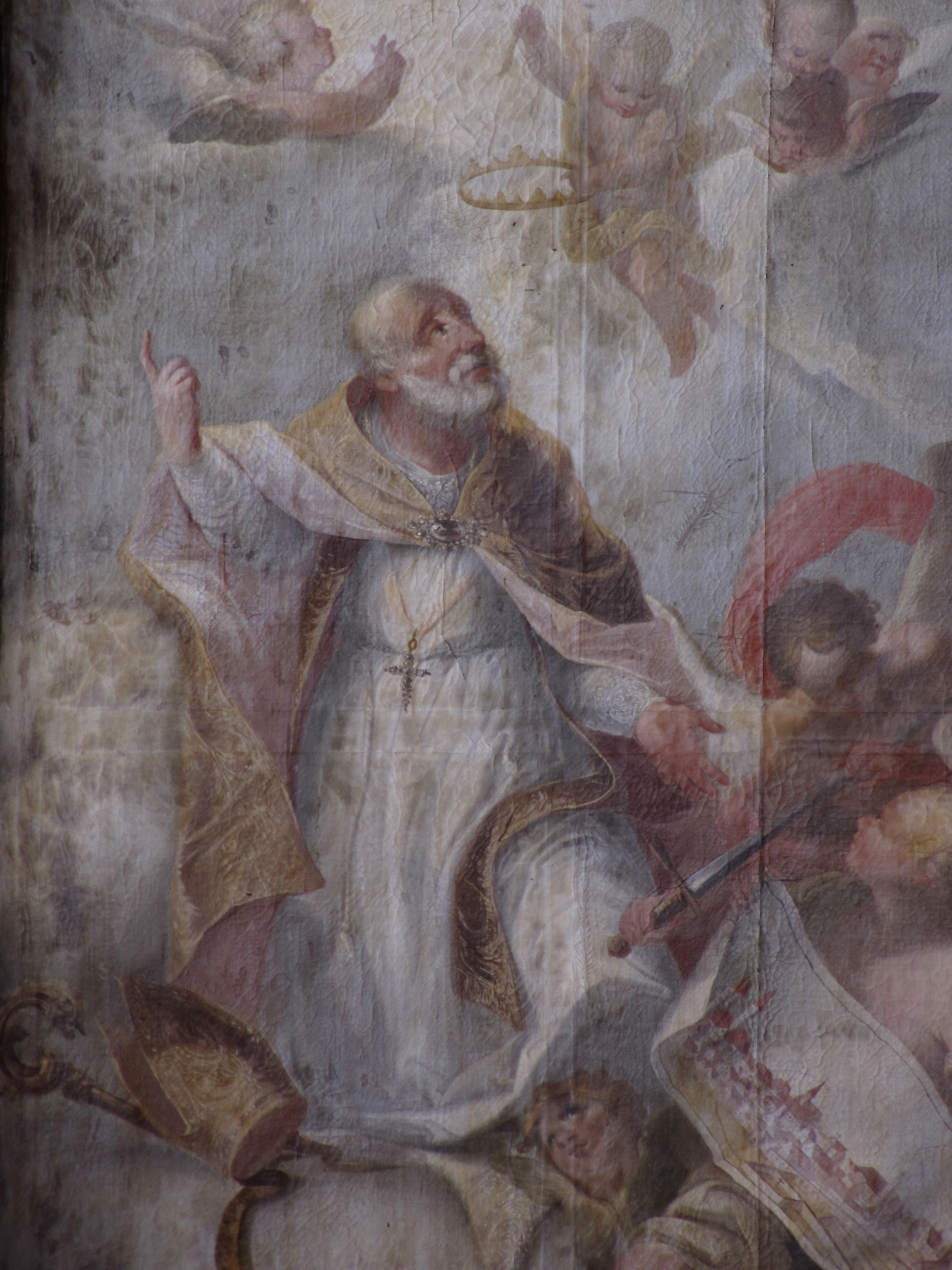
- Saint Valentine
- Pronunciation: /væləntaɪn/
- Gender: Unisex

Origin
- Origin: Latin Valentinus
- Meaning: "strong, healthy, brave, rule"

Other names
- Nicknames: Vale, Val
- Related names: Valentin, Valentim, Valentina, Valentino, Valentini, Val, Valentinian, Bálint Valerius

Valentine is both a masculine and a feminine given name, and a surname, derived from the Roman family name Valentinus, which was derived from the Latin word valens, which means "strong and healthy". Valentine can be considered an English translation or adaptation of the names Valentinus or Valentinian. It was the name of several saints of the Roman Catholic Church. St. Valentine's Day was named for a third-century martyr. The usual feminine form of the name is Valentina.

== Name variants ==
- Balendin (Basque)
- Валентин Valentìn, Валю Valyu, Вальо Valyo, Валедин Vàledin (Bulgarian)
- Bálint (Hungarian)
- Folant (Welsh)
- Ualan (Scottish Gaelic)
- Val (English)
- Valentino, Valentina, Valentin, Valerius, Valentine (Indonesian)
- Βαλεντίνος "Valentinos" (male), Βαλεντίνα "Valentina" (female) (Greek)
- Valentijn (Dutch)
- Valentín (Slovak, Spanish)
- Valentin (Bulgarian, Croatian, Czech, French, German, Romanian, Russian, Scandinavian, Slovenian)
- Valentino, Valentini, Vale, Tino, Valentina (Italian)
- Valentyn (Ukrainian)
- Vali, Valentin (Romanian)
- Walenty (Polish)
- Valentim, Valentina (Portuguese)
- Βαλεντίνη (female) (Greek)
- Valentí (Catalan)

== People with the given name ==
- Saint Valentine, 3rd century Roman saint
- Valentine of Passau (died 475), Catholic saint, monk, abbot, bishop and hermit
- Pope Valentine (died 827), briefly Roman Catholic pope
- Valentine Abt (1873–1942), American composer and mandolin player
- Valentine Ackland (1906–1969), English poet
- Valentine Berriochoa, one of the Vietnamese Martyrs
- Valentine Colasante (born 1989), French ballet dancer
- Valentine de Saint-Point (1875–1953), French poet, playwright and painter
- Valentine Dyall (1908–1985), British actor
- Valentine Eckert (1733–1821), German-born Pennsylvania politician, militia officer, and judge
- Valentine Fleming (1882–1917), British politician, father of author Ian Fleming
- Valentine Friedli (1929–2016), Swiss politician from the Jura
- Valentine de Giuli (born 1990), Swiss archer
- Valentine Hollingsworth (1632–1710), settler of the Delaware Colony
- Valentine Holmes (born 1995), Australian rugby league player and American football player
- Valentine Kipketer (born 1993), Kenyan half marathon and marathon runner
- Valentine Nekesa (born 1997), Kenyan entrepreneur
- Val Page, British motorcycle designer
- Valentine Schlegel (1925–2021), French sculptor and ceramicist
- Valentine Strudwick (1900–1916), British soldier
- Valentine Tessier (1892–1981), French actress
- Valentine Warner (born 1972), British television chef

== People with the surname ==
=== Actors ===
- Anthony Valentine (1939–2015), English actor
- Brooke Valentine, actress
- Karen Valentine, American actress and star of Room 222
- Kym Valentine, actress
- Scott Valentine (actor)
- Stacy Valentine, pornographic actress
- Steve Valentine, actor

=== Artists ===
- DeWain Valentine (1936–2022), American sculptor
- Edward Virginius Valentine, sculptor
- James Valentine (photographer)

=== Business people ===
- Alexander Valentine, Chairman of London Transport from 1959 to 1965
- Brian Valentine, software executive
- Don Valentine, businessman
- Elmer Valentine, nightclub owner

=== Musicians ===
- Ann Valentine (1762–1842), English organist and composer
- Dickie Valentine, pop singer
- Hilton Valentine, guitarist
- James Valentine (musician)
- James Valentine (Australian musician)
- Kathy Valentine, bassist
- Kid Thomas Valentine, trumpeter
- Robert Valentine (composer) (c. 1671–1747)

=== Politicians ===
- Daniel Mulford Valentine (1830–1907), Kansas politician and judge
- Edward K. Valentine (1843–1916), 19th-century politician
- Emery Valentine (1858–1930), Alaskan politician
- Itimous T. Valentine Sr. (1887–1970), North Carolina politician and judge
- John K. Valentine (1904–1950), Iowa politician
- John L. Valentine (fl. 1970s–2010s), Utah politician
- Hugh Valentine (1848–1932), New Zealand Member of Parliament
- Lewis Valentine (1893–1986), Welsh politician and activist
- Mary Valentine (born 1946), Michigan politician
- Rob Valentine (born 1950), Lord Mayor of Hobart
- Tim Valentine (1926–2015), North Carolina politician

=== Scientists ===
- David H. Valentine (1912–1987), British botanist
- James W. Valentine (1926–2023), American evolutionary biologist

=== Sportspeople ===
- Alf Valentine, cricketer
- Bob Valentine (referee), Scottish football referee
- Bob Valentine (footballer), English rugby league and football (soccer) player
- Bob Valentine (baseball), baseball player
- Bob Valentine (speedway rider), Australian motorcycle speedway rider
- Bobby Valentine, American baseball player and manager
- Bryan Valentine, cricketer
- Carl Valentine, footballer
- Carrington Valentine (born 2001), American football player
- Cheryl Valentine, Scottish field hockey midfielder
- Chris Valentine, hockey player
- Darnell Valentine, basketball player
- Dave Valentine, Scottish rugby union and rugby league footballer
- Denzel Valentine, basketball player
- Ellis Valentine, baseball player
- Greg Valentine, wrestler
- Howard Valentine, track and field athlete
- John Valentine, Canadian cricketer
- Johnny Valentine, wrestler
- Josh Valentine, rugby footballer
- Rob Valentine, Scottish rugby union and rugby league footballer
- Ryan Valentine, footballer
- Scott Valentine (ice hockey)
- Vincent Valentine (cricketer)

=== Others ===
- George Valentine (disambiguation)
- Helen Valentine (1893–1986), founder of Seventeen magazine
- Herbert J. Valentine (1917–1996), American Marine officer, flying ace and Navy Cross recipient
- Jean Valentine (1934–2020), American poet
- Jean Valentine (bombe operator) (1924–2019), British wartime codebreaker
- Jo Valentine, pseudonym of American writer Charlotte Armstrong (1905–1969)
- Jo Valentine, Baroness Valentine (born 1958), British businesswoman and non-executive director
- Kristin Bervig Valentine (1933–2024), communications professor
- Lewis J. Valentine (1882–1946), Police Commissioner of New York City
- Penny Valentine (1943–2003), music critic
- Phil Valentine (1959–2021), American radio personality
- Tsakane Valentine (born 1979), South African classical soprano
- William Orison Valentine (1862–1928), American missionary

=== Fictional characters ===
- Aubrey Valentine, minor character from the British soap opera EastEnders
- Beka Valentine, Andromeda
- Calvin Valentine, Hollyoaks
- Carmel Valentine, Hollyoaks
- Cat Valentine, character from the television series Victorious and Sam & Cat
- Diane Valentine, Hollyoaks
- Dick Valentine, fictional radio call-in show host, National Lampoon
- Esther Valentine, The Young and the Restless
- Faye Valentine, Cowboy Bebop
- Funny Valentine, JoJo's Bizzare Adventure
- Isabella "Ivy" Valentine, from the video game Soulcalibur
- Jill Valentine, from the video game and film Resident Evil
- Keith Valentine, vampire in the game Shadow Hearts
- Leo Valentine, in the soap opera Hollyoaks
- Nick Valentine, a synth private detective and companion in Fallout 4
- Sasha Valentine, in the soap opera Hollyoaks
- Shirley Valentine, from the play of the same name
- Skeeter Valentine, from the Nickelodeon cartoon Doug
- Sonny Valentine, in the soap opera Hollyoaks
- Thaddeus and Katherine Valentine, from Mortal Engines by Philip Reeve and its 2018 film adaptation
- Tiffany Valentine, in the Child's Play franchise films
- Vincent Valentine, from the video games Final Fantasy VII and Dirge of Cerberus: Final Fantasy VII
- Valentine Morgenstern, the primary antagonist in Cassandra Clare's The Mortal Instruments series
- Valentine Michael Smith, protagonist of Stranger in a Strange Land by Robert A. Heinlein
- Valentine Wiggin, from the Ender's Game book series by Orson Scott Card

== See also ==
- Justice Valentine (disambiguation)
