= Valentino (surname) =

Valentino is an Italian surname. Notable people with the name include:

- Bobby Valentino (American singer) (born Robert Wilson, 1980), now known as Bobby V
- Bobby Valentino (British musician) (born c. 1954), British violinist, singer, songwriter and actor
- Francis Valentino, American musician
- Henri Valentino (1785–1865), French conductor
- Jim Valentino (born 1952), American comic book creator
- Rob Valentino (born 1985), American soccer player
- Robert Valentine (composer) (c. 1671–1747), Anglo-Italian composer also known as Roberto Valentino
- Rudolph Valentino (1895–1926), Italian-American silent film actor
- Sal Valentino (born 1942), lead singer of The Beau Brummels
- Thomas J. Valentino (died 1986), American businessman, among the first to develop libraries of sound effects and taped music
- Val Valentino (born 1956), American magician, illusionist, and actor using the stage name the Masked Magician

== See also ==
- Valentino (given name)
- Valentine (name)
- Valentini (surname)
- Valentinov (Russian: Валентинов), Russian surname
- Valentino (disambiguation)
