= Valentini =

Valentini may refer to:

== Places ==
- Palazzo Valentini, a palazzo in Rome, Italy
- Ca'Valentini, a subdivision of the Casalgrande commune in Emilia-Romagna, Italy

== People ==
- Valentini (ancient people), an ancient people of Sardinia
- Valentini (surname), a surname and, less commonly, a given name
  - Valentini, an aristocratic family, at one time owners of Canossa Castle
- Valentino (surname), pluralized as Valentini
- Valentino Urbani (1690–1722), Italian alto castrato singer, known as "Valentini"

== See also ==
- Bianchi's warbler (Seicercus valentini), species of Old World warbler in the family Sylviidae
- Davidson/Valentini Award, a Gay & Lesbian Alliance Against Defamation award named after Michael Valentini, a GLAAD supporter
- Valentinni's sharpnose puffer (Canthigaster valentini), pufferfish of the genus Canthigaster
- Valentin (disambiguation)
- Valentina (disambiguation)
- Valentine (disambiguation)
- Valentino (disambiguation)
- Valentinus (disambiguation)
