= Valentine =

A valentine is a card or gift given on Valentine's Day, or one's sweetheart.

Valentine or Valentines may also refer to:

== People and fictional characters ==
- Valentine (name), a given name and a surname, including a list of people and fictional characters so named
  - Saint Valentine of Rome, the eponym of Valentine's Day
  - Pope Valentine, pope for two months in 827
- Valentine (writer), pseudonym of Archibald Thomas Pechey

== Places ==
=== United States ===
- Valentine, Arizona, an unincorporated community
- Valentine, Indiana, an unincorporated town
- Valentine, Kansas City, a neighborhood in Kansas City, Missouri
- Valentine, Nebraska, a city
- Valentine National Wildlife Refuge, Nebraska
- Valentine, New Jersey, an unincorporated community
- Valentine, Texas, a town
- Valentines, Virginia, an unincorporated community

=== Elsewhere ===
- Cape Valentine, Elephant Island, Antarctica
- Valentine, New South Wales, Australia, a suburb of Lake Macquarie
- Valentine Falls, a waterfall in New South Wales
- Valentine, Haute-Garonne, France, a commune
- Valentines (ward), a ward of Redbridge London Borough Council, Greater London
- Valentine (river), a river in the Haute-Vienne department, France
- Valentines, Uruguay, a town
- Valentine, a town in Red Dead Redemption 2

== Buildings ==
- Valentine Theatre, Toledo, Ohio
- The Valentine, a museum of local history in Richmond, Virginia

== Arts and entertainment ==
=== Film and television ===
- Valentine (film), a 2001 horror film
- Valentine (2017 film), a documentary by Paul Thomas Anderson about the making of the album Something to Tell You
- Valentine (TV series), an American romantic comedy-drama television show
- "Valentine" (The Secret Circle), a 2012 episode of The Secret Circle

=== Literature ===
- Valentine (novel) an 1832 novel by George Sand
- Valentines (short story collection), a 2007 collection of short stories by Olaf Olafsson

==== Performers and labels ====
- Valentine Records, an independent British label
- The Valentines (doo-wop band), an American group of the mid-1950s
- The Valentines (rock band), an Australian band active from 1966–1970

==== Albums ====
- Valentine (Snail Mail album) (2021)
- Valentine (Bill Frisell album) (2020)
- Valentine (Roy Harper album) (1974)
- Valentines (EP), by Mariah Carey (1999)

==== Songs ====
- "Valentine" (5 Seconds of Summer song) (2018)
- "Valentine" (Jim Brickman song) (1997), a hit for Martina McBride
- "Valentine" (Maurice Chevalier song) (1925)
- "Valentine" (Delays song) (2006)
- "Valentine" (Laufey song) (2022)
- "Valentine" (Lloyd song) (2007)
- "Valentine" (Måneskin song) (2023)
- "Valentine" (Snail Mail song) (2021)
- "Valentine" (T'Pau song) (1988)
- "Valentine" (Jessie Ware and Sampha song) (2011)
- "Valentine", by Fiona Apple from The Idler Wheel...
- "Valentine", by Blonde Redhead
- "Valentine", by Inhaler from Cuts & Bruises
- "Valentine", by Justice from Cross
- "Valentine", by Kina Grannis
- "Valentine", by Tatiana Okupnik
- "Valentine", by Train from A Girl, a Bottle, a Boat
- "Valentine", by Xandria from Neverworld's End
- "Valentine", by XXXTentacion from Revenge
- "Valentine", by YK Osiris from The Golden Child
- "Valentine", by the Get Up Kids from Something to Write Home About
- "Valentine", by the Replacements from Pleased to Meet Me
- "Valentine", from the musical Love Birds
- "Valentine", by Jaydes from Ghetto Cupid

== Sea vessels ==
- HMS Valentine, four Royal Navy vessels
- USS Valentine, a 1945 World War II stores ship
- Valentine (1780 EIC ship), an East Indiaman

== Other uses ==
- Valentine School (disambiguation)
- Valentine tank, a British Second World War tank model
- 447 Valentine, an asteroid
- Valentine (restaurant), a chain in Quebec, Canada
- Valentine, a racehorse who competed in the 1840 Grand National Steeplechase
- Valentine, a sunflower variety
- Valentine Formation, a geologic unit in Nebraska, United States
- Olivetti Valentine, a typewriter

== See also ==
- Valentin
- Valentine Building (disambiguation)
- Valentine House (disambiguation)
- Valentiner (disambiguation)
- Valentinian (disambiguation)
- Valentin (disambiguation)
- Valentina (disambiguation)
- Valentini (disambiguation)
- Valentino (disambiguation)
- Valentinus (disambiguation)
