= Tino =

Tino is an Italian name or nickname, often a diminutive of the names Agostino, Costantino, Martino, Antonino, Valentino, Giustino, Sabatino, Faustino, Santino, Tristino, and other names ending in -tino.

Tino may refer to:

== People ==
=== Given name ===
- Tino Ausenda (1919–1976), Italian racing cyclist
- Tino Berbig (born 1980), German football-goalkeeper
- Tino Best (born 1981), West Indian cricketer
- Tino Bianchi (1905–1996), Italian actor
- Tino Bonk (born 1967), German bobsledder
- Tino Boos (born 1975), German ice hockey player
- Tino di Camaino (1280–1337), Italian sculptor
- Tino Caspanello (born 1960), Italian playwright, actor and director
- Tino Edelmann (born 1985), German Nordic combined skier
- Tino Ellis (born 1997), American football player
- Tino Fiumara (1941–2010), Italian-American mobster
- Tino Häber (born 1982), German javelin player
- Tino Hanekamp (born 1979), German journalist
- Tino Lagator (born 1987), Croatian footballer
- Tino de Lara (1917–?), Filipino actor
- Tino Mewes (born 1983), German actor
- Tino Mohaupt (born 1983), German sports shooter
- Tino Palmasto (born 1998), Finnish footballer
- Tino Pattiera (1890–1966), Croatian tenor
- Tino Pietrogiovanna (born 1950), Italian alpine skier
- Tino Purme (born 1998), Finnish footballer
- Tino Rodríguez, Mexican-American painter
- Tino Sabbadini (1928–2002), French road bicycle racer
- Tino Sanandaji (born 1980), Kurdish-Swedish economist and author
- Tino Schaedler (born 1972), German film director
- Tino Schirinzi (1934–1993), Italian actor and stage director
- Tino Schmidt (born 1993), German footballer
- Tino Schomann (born 1987), German politician
- Tino Scicluna, American soccer player
- Tino Scotti (1905–1984), Italian film actor
- Tino Sehgal (born 1976), British-German artist
- Tino Semmer (born 1985), German footballer
- Tino Sunseri (born 1988), Canadian football quarterback
- Tino Tabak (born 1946), Dutch-New Zealand cyclist
- Tino Thömel (born 1988), German former road cyclist
- Tino Vegar (born 1967), Croatian water polo player
- Tino Villanueva (born 1941), American poet and writer
- Tino Weber (born 1970), German backstroke swimmer
- Tino Wenzel (born 1973), German sports shooter

=== Nickname ===
- Alberto Costa (footballer), Spanish footballer commonly known as Tino
- Tino (footballer, born 1967), Santomean footballer and football manager
- Tino (footballer, born 1988), Cape Verdean footballer
- K-Tino (born 1966), real name Cathérine Edoa Ngoa, Cameroonian singer
- Faustino Asprilla (born 1969), former Colombian footballer commonly known as Tino
- Tino, real name Constantino Fernández Fernández, member of Spanish children's band Parchís
- Tino, real name Étienne Boué Bi, known by the pseudonym Tino, singer, musician, member of Ivorian band Magic System
- Tino Buazzelli (1922–1980), Italian film actor
- Tino Carraro (1910–1995), Italian actor
- Tino Casal (1950–1991), Spanish singer-writer and producer
- Tino Ceberano (born 1942), Australian karateka
- Tino Conti (born 1945), Italian road cyclist
- Tino Coury (born 1988), American singer-songwriter
- Tino De Angelis (born 1915), American commodities trader
- Altino Domingues (born 1951), Portuguese-American retired soccer defender
- Tino Folgar (1892–1983), Spanish operatic tenor
- Tino García (1935–2015), Nicaraguan–Puerto Rican comedic actor
- Tino di Geraldo (born 1960), French-Spanish percussionist born Faustino Fernández Fernández
- Tino Insana (1948–2017), American actor, director, writer and film producer
- Tino Kadewere (born 1996), Zimbabwean footballer
- Tino Lettieri (born 1957), Italian football goalkeeper
- Tino Martinez (born 1967), first baseman in Major League Baseball
- Tino Mawoyo (born 1986), Zimbabwean cricketer
- Tino Nuñez (born 1984), American soccer player
- Tino Petrelli (1922–2001), Italian photographer
- Tino Rossi (1907–1983), Corsican singer

=== Ring name ===
- Tino Sabbatelli, a ring name of American professional wrestler Sabatino Piscitelli (born 1983)

=== Surname ===
- Ionatana Tino

== Places ==
- Cupertino, California, United States
  - Cupertino High School, referred to as Tino
- Tino (island), an Italian island

== Other uses ==
- Typhoon Tino, a list of storms
- Tino Corp., a record company
- Tino (elephant), a famous elephant in Lai Chi Kok Zoo in Hong Kong
- Nissan Almera Tino, a compact MPV
- Tino, a character on the TV drama My So-Called Life
- TINO, also known as MEX3D, an RNA-binding protein

== See also ==
- Tina (given name)
