= The Valentines =

The Valentines may refer to:

- The Valentines (rock band), Australian rock 'n' roll band active from 1966–1970, chiefly noted for their lead singer, Bon Scott
- The Valentines (doo-wop band), American Doo Wop group from the mid-1950s

== See also ==
- Valentine (disambiguation)
