= Valentine House =

Valentine House may refer to:

in England

- Valentine House, Essex, house of lineage, and/or estate home of the Raymond Baronetcy, of the Burrell baronets and in particular of Sir Charles Burrell, 3rd Baronet

in the United States

- Campbell House (Okahumpka, Florida), also known as Valentine House, NRHP-listed
- Valentine House (Macon, Georgia), NRHP-listed but demolished
- John Valentine House, Muncie, Indiana, NRHP-listed in Delaware County
- Valentine Soap Workers Cottages, Cambridge, Massachusetts, NRHP-listed
- Valentine-French House, Fall River, Massachusetts, NRHP-listed
- Walker and Valentine House, Rushford, Minnesota, NRHP-listed in Fillmore County, Minnesota
- Valentine-Varian House, Bronx, New York City, NRHP-listed
- Cock-Valentine House, Oyster Bay, New York, one of Oyster Bay's town landmarks
- Valentine Hall, a building at St. Lawrence University
- Obidian W. Valentine House, a contributing building in the Main Street Historic District (Roslyn, New York), NRHP-listed
- Kent-Valentine House, Richmond, Virginia, NRHP-listed
- Wickham House, also known as the Wickham-Valentine House or the Valentine Museum, in Richmond, Virginia, a U.S. National Historic Landmark
- Valentine Richmond History Center, Richmond, Virginia

== See also ==
- Valentine School (disambiguation)
- Valentine Building (disambiguation)
