= Rezső Bálint =

Rezső Bálint may refer to:

- Rezső Bálint (painter) (1885–1945), Hungarian painter
- Rezső Bálint (physician) (1874–1929), Austro-Hungarian neurologist and psychiatrist
