= Justice Valentine =

Justice Valentine may refer to:

- Itimous T. Valentine Sr. (1887–1970), associate justice of the North Carolina Supreme Court
- Daniel Mulford Valentine (1830–1907), associate justice of the Kansas Supreme Court

== See also ==
- "Valentine," a song on the 2008 album Cross by Justice
- Valentine (disambiguation)
