= Umeres =

Umeres is a surname. Notable people with the surname include:

- Elías Umeres (born 1995), Argentine professional footballer
- Valentín Umeres (born 2003), Argentine footballer
