= Valentin (disambiguation) =

Valentin is a male given name.

Valentin or Valentín may also refer to:

- Valentin (surname), a surname
- Valentin Taifun, biplane of the modern German Valentin Flugzeug company
- Valentin (grape), another name for the Austrian wine grape Roter Veltliner
  - Vermentino, another wine grape with Valentin as a synonym
- The Nazi Germany code name for the Valentin submarine pens
- Valentín, a 2002 Argentine film
- Valentín Alsina, Buenos Aires, an Argentine town

== See also ==
- Saint Valentin (disambiguation)
- Valentina (disambiguation)
- Valentine (disambiguation)
- Valentini (disambiguation)
- Valentino (disambiguation)
