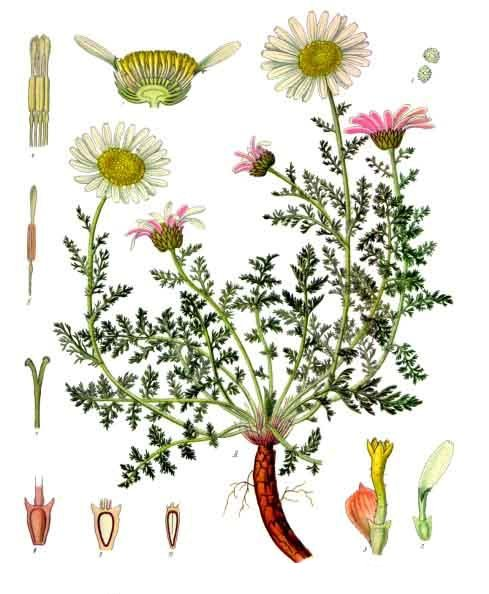
- Anacyclus pyrethrum

Scientific classification
- Kingdom: Plantae
- Clade: Embryophytes
- Clade: Tracheophytes
- Clade: Spermatophytes
- Clade: Angiosperms
- Clade: Eudicots
- Clade: Asterids
- Order: Asterales
- Family: Asteraceae
- Subfamily: Asteroideae
- Tribe: Anthemideae
- Genus: Anacyclus; L. (1753)

Type species
- Anacyclus valentinus L. IPNI

Synonyms
- Cyrtolepis Less.

= Anacyclus =

Genus of flowering plants

Anacyclus is a genus of plants in the family Asteraceae described by Linnaeus in 1753. Annuals or herbaceous perennials, they are cultivated for their fern-like leaves on creeping, radiating stems and daisy-like flowers. They are frost-hardy but may tolerate winter temperatures below −5 °C (23 °F) if grown in well-drained soil.

Anacyclus species are native to stony or sandy slopes in southern and western Europe, North Africa, and the Middle East.

The roots of A. pyrethrum are known as pellitory in Europe and akrakara in India. The root is imported mainly from Mediterranean countries. Because of its powerful irritant action, in Ayurvedic medicine the root is considered a stimulant and is often an ingredient of aphrodisiacs and nervous stimulants used in facial palsy, paralysis, hemiplegia, fibromyalgia, etc.

Species E+M, UniProt,

- Anacyclus anatolicus Behçet & Almanar
- Anacyclus ciliatus Trautv.
- Anacyclus clavatus (Desf.) Pers.
- Anacyclus homogamos (Maire) Humphries
- Anacyclus inconstans Pomel
- Anacyclus latealatus Hub.-Mor.
- Anacyclus linearilobus Boiss. & Reut.
- Anacyclus maroccanus (Ball) Ball
- Anacyclus monanthos (L.) Thell.
- Anacyclus nigellifolius Boiss.
- Anacyclus officinarum Hayne
- Anacyclus pyrethrum (L.) Link
- Anacyclus radiatus Loisel.
- Anacyclus valentinus L.
