= Valentiner =

Valentiner may refer to:

- Herman Valentiner, Danish mathematician, who introduced the
  - Valentiner group in mathematics
- Karl Wilhelm Valentiner, astronomer
- Max Valentiner, U-boat captain
- Wilhelm Valentiner, art historian

== See also ==
- Valentine (disambiguation)
