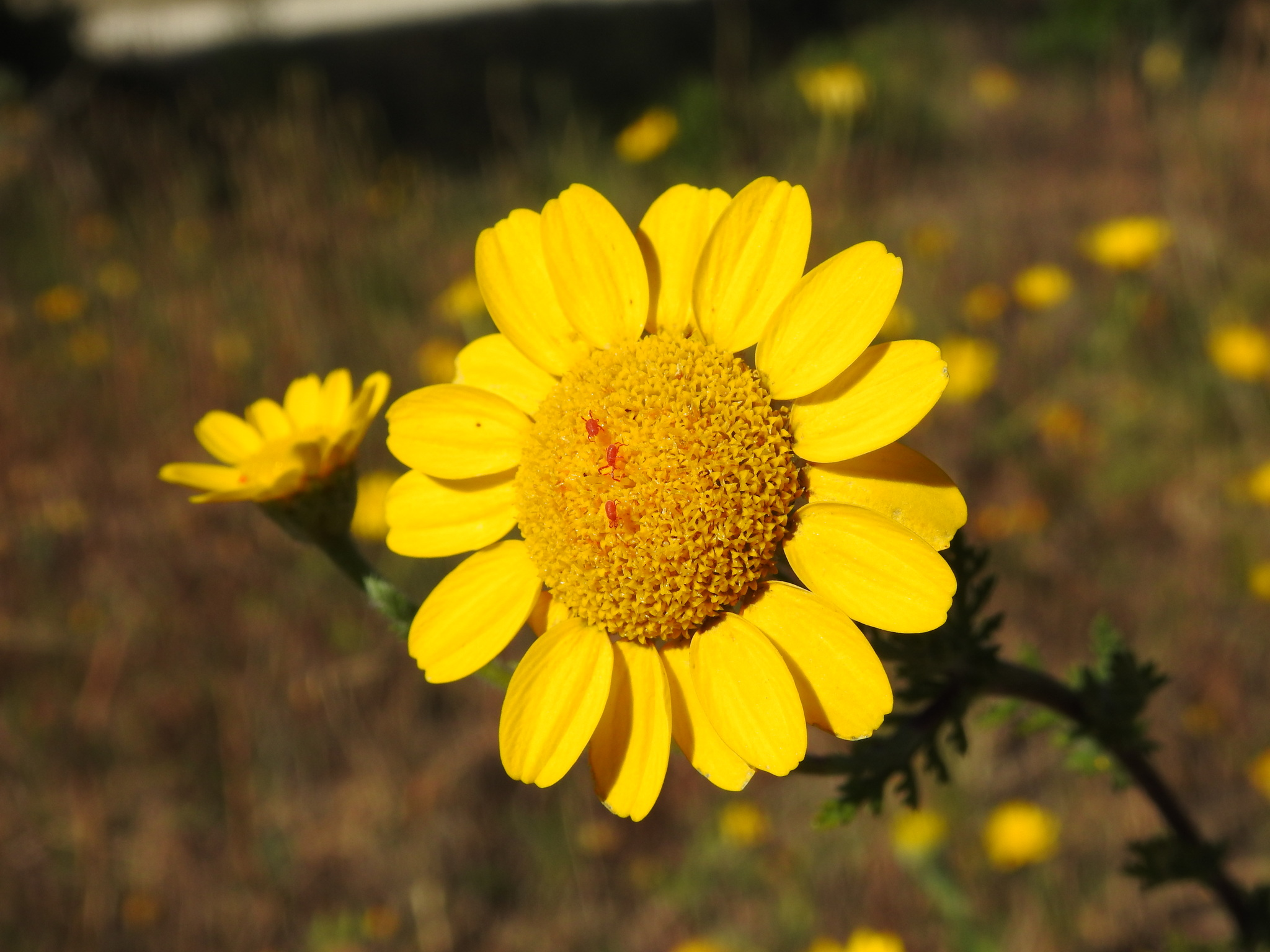

Scientific classification
- Kingdom: Plantae
- Clade: Embryophytes
- Clade: Tracheophytes
- Clade: Angiosperms
- Clade: Eudicots
- Clade: Asterids
- Order: Asterales
- Family: Asteraceae
- Genus: Anacyclus
- Species: A. radiatus

Binomial name
- Anacyclus radiatus Loisel.

= Anacyclus radiatus =

Species of plant

Anacyclus radiatus is a species of annual herb in the family Asteraceae native to the western Mediterranean Basin. They have a self-supporting growth form. Flowers are visited by Siphona, drone fly, Tachina, and Cyclyrius webbianus. Individuals can grow to 40 cm. It has been introduced to the Eastern Mediterranean and the island of Java.
