= Valentini (surname) =

Valentini is a surname and, less commonly, a given name, of Italian origin. It is etymologically related to the name, Valentine. People with the name include:

== People with the surname ==
- Valentini, an aristocratic family, at one time owners of Canossa Castle
- Alfredo Valentini (born 1946), Sammarinese sports shooter
- Andrea Valentini (designer) (born 1961), American designer
- Andrea Valentini (pentathlete) (born 1977), Italian modern pentathlete
- Andrea Valentini, drummer for Blood, Sweat & Tears since 2001
- Antonio Valentini, president of Central Bank of San Marino
- Antony Valentini, theoretical physicist
- Carlo Valentini (born 1982), San Marinese footballer
- Federico Valentini (born 1982), San Marinese footballer
- Frank Valentini (born 1963), American television producer, executive producer for the ABC soap opera One Life to Live, currently General Hospital
- Gian Domenico Valentini (1639–1715), Italian still life painter
- Gino Valentini (born 1958), Chilean football manager and former footballer
- Giovanni Valentini (c. 1582–1649), Italian baroque composer, teacher of Johann Kaspar Kerll
- Giovanni Valentini (classical era composer) (c. 1730–1804), Italian classical composer, poet and painter.
- Giovanni Valentini (pianist), Italian pianist, teacher of Gianluca Luisi
- Giuseppe Valentini (albanologist) (1900–1979), Italian albanologist
- Giuseppe Valentini (1681–1753), Italian violinist, painter, poet, and composer
- Jean-Pierre Valentini, Trafigura executive, see 2006 Ivory Coast toxic waste dump
- Laura Valentini, Italian philosopher
- Lucia Valentini Terrani (1946–1998), Italian operatic mezzo-soprano
- Mariella Valentini (born 1959), Italian actress
- Michele Valentini (born 1986), Italian professional footballer
- Nicolás Valentini (born 2001), Argentine professional footballer
- Pier Francesco Valentini (1570-1654), Italian music theorist
- Roberto Valentini (c. 1671–1747), Anglo-Italian composer also known as Robert Valentine
- Vincent Valentini (died 1948), American screenwriter

=== Fictional ===
- Flip Valentini, character in the Baseball Card Adventures series of novels by Dan Gutman
- Harry Valentini, protagonist of Wise Guys
- Stefano Valentini, primary antagonist in the first half of The Evil Within 2

== People with the given name ==
- Valentini Daskaloudi, (born 1979; Greek: Βαλεντίνη Δασκαλούδη), Greek female fashion model
- Valentini Grammatikopoulou (born 1997; Greek: Βαλεντίνη Γραμματικοπούλου), Greek woman tennis player
- Valentino Urbani (fl. 1690–1722), Italian male castrato opera singer nicknamed "Valentini"

== See also ==
- Valentini (disambiguation)
