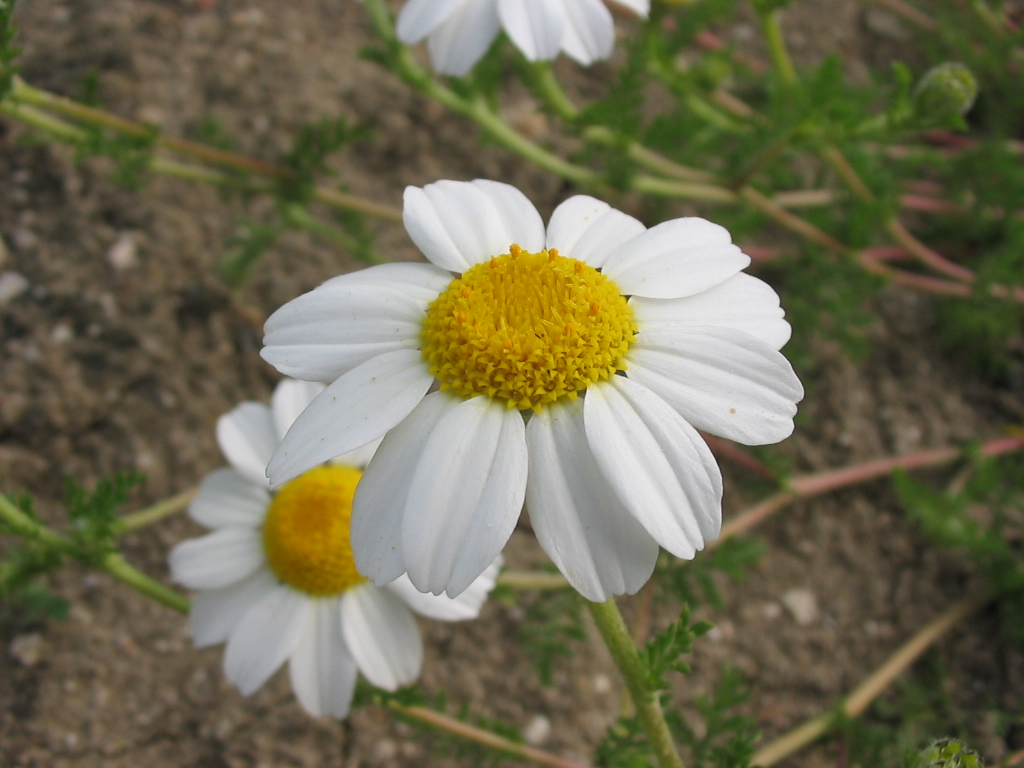
- White Anacyclus

Scientific classification
- Kingdom: Plantae
- Clade: Tracheophytes
- Clade: Angiosperms
- Clade: Eudicots
- Clade: Asterids
- Order: Asterales
- Family: Asteraceae
- Genus: Anacyclus
- Species: A. clavatus

Binomial name
- Anacyclus clavatus (Desf.) Pers. (1807)

Synonyms
- Anacyclus candollii Nyman; Anacyclus capillifolius Maire; Anthemis clavata Desf.; Anacyclus pedunculatus (Desf.) Pers.; Anacyclus pubescens (Willd.) Rchb.; Anacyclus tomentosus DC.; Anthemis clavata Desf.; Anthemis incrassata Link; Anthemis pubescens Willd.; Chamaemelum incrassatum Hoffmanns. & Link; Sources: E+M AFPD, IPNI

= Anacyclus clavatus =

Species of flowering plant

Anacyclus clavata also known as Camomilla tomentosa, Pusteni targok, vit bertram, white anacyclus and white buttons is a member of the genus Anacyclus and the tribe Anthemideae and family Asteraceae.

== Distribution ==
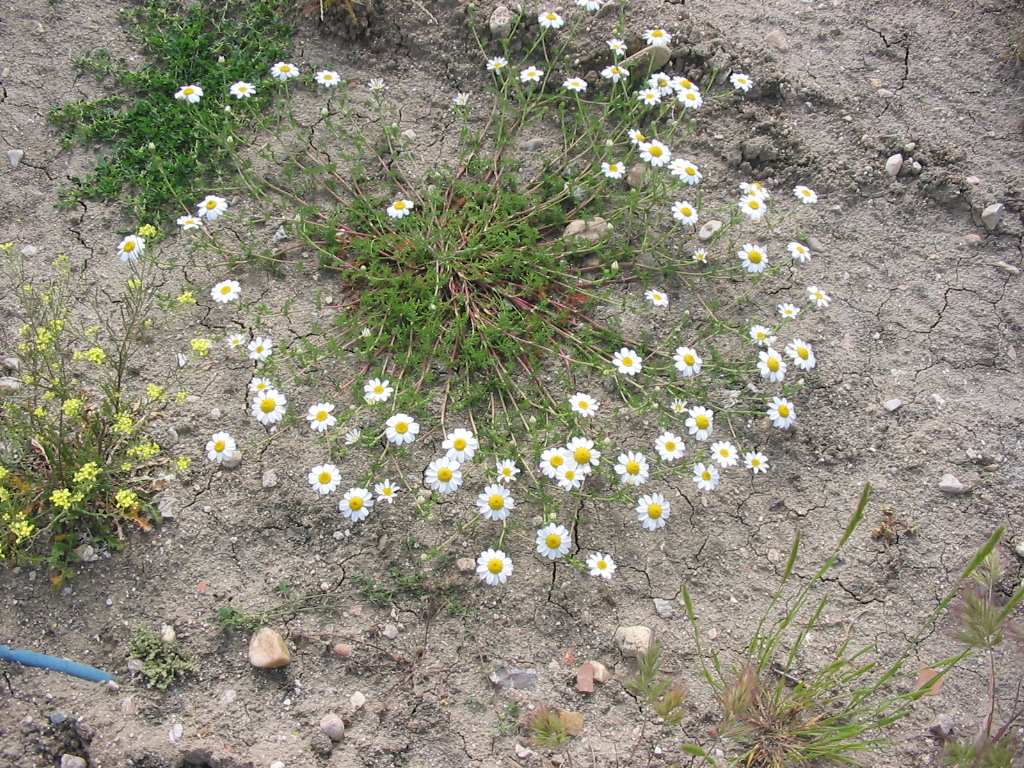
Habitat

Native

Palearctic
Northern Africa: Algeria, Libya, Morocco, Tunisia
Macaronesia: Lanzarote
Southwestern Europe: Ibiza, Mallorca, Menorca, France, Portugal, Spain
Southeastern Europe: Croatia, Greece, Italy, Malta, Sardinia, Sicily, Turkey

Source: E+M
