= Walentynów =

Walentynów may refer to the following places:

- Walentynów, Poddębice County in Łódź Voivodeship (central Poland)
- Walentynów, Lubartów County in Lublin Voivodeship (east Poland)
- Walentynów, Lublin County in Lublin Voivodeship (east Poland)
- Walentynów, Gmina Budziszewice, Tomaszów County in Łódź Voivodeship (central Poland)
- Walentynów, Lipsko County in Masovian Voivodeship (east-central Poland)
- Walentynów, Radom County in Masovian Voivodeship (east-central Poland)
- Walentynów, Greater Poland Voivodeship (west-central Poland)

== See also ==
- Valentinov, a surname
