= Lawrence H. Fountain =

American politician

L.H. Fountain
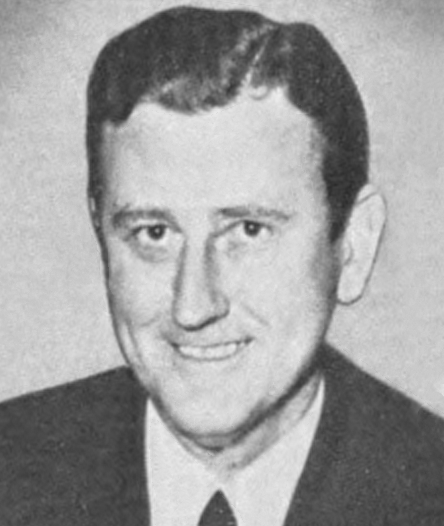

Member of the U.S. House of Representatives from North Carolina's 2nd district
- In office January 3, 1953 – January 3, 1983
- Preceded by: John H. Kerr
- Succeeded by: Tim Valentine

Member of the North Carolina Senate from the 4th district
- In office 1947–1953 Serving with Julian Allsbrook
- Preceded by: R. L. Applewhite; W. G. Clark
- Succeeded by: W. Lunsford Crew; Cameron S. Weeks

Personal details
- Born: Lawrence H. Fountain; April 23, 1913 Leggett, North Carolina, U.S.
- Died: October 10, 2002 (aged 89) Raleigh, North Carolina, U.S.
- Party: Democratic
- Spouse: Christine Fountain
- Education: University of North Carolina at Chapel Hill

Lawrence H. Fountain (April 23, 1913 – October 10, 2002) was an American lawyer and World War II veteran who served 15 terms as a Democratic U.S. representative from North Carolina from 1953 to 1983.

== Early life ==
Fountain was educated in the public schools of Edgecombe County and at the University of North Carolina at Chapel Hill where he received his A. B. degree in 1934 and his Juris Doctor degree. He was admitted to the North Carolina Bar following graduation from law school in 1936.

He practiced law in Tarboro, North Carolina and was active in statewide Democratic Party politics until March 1942 when he entered the United States Army as a private in the infantry. He rose through the ranks and was released from service as a major in the Judge Advocate General's Office on March 4, 1946. Fountain then returned to his law practice in Tarboro. In civilian life, he remained a member of the U. S. Army Reserve and later retired as a lieutenant colonel.

== Service in public office ==
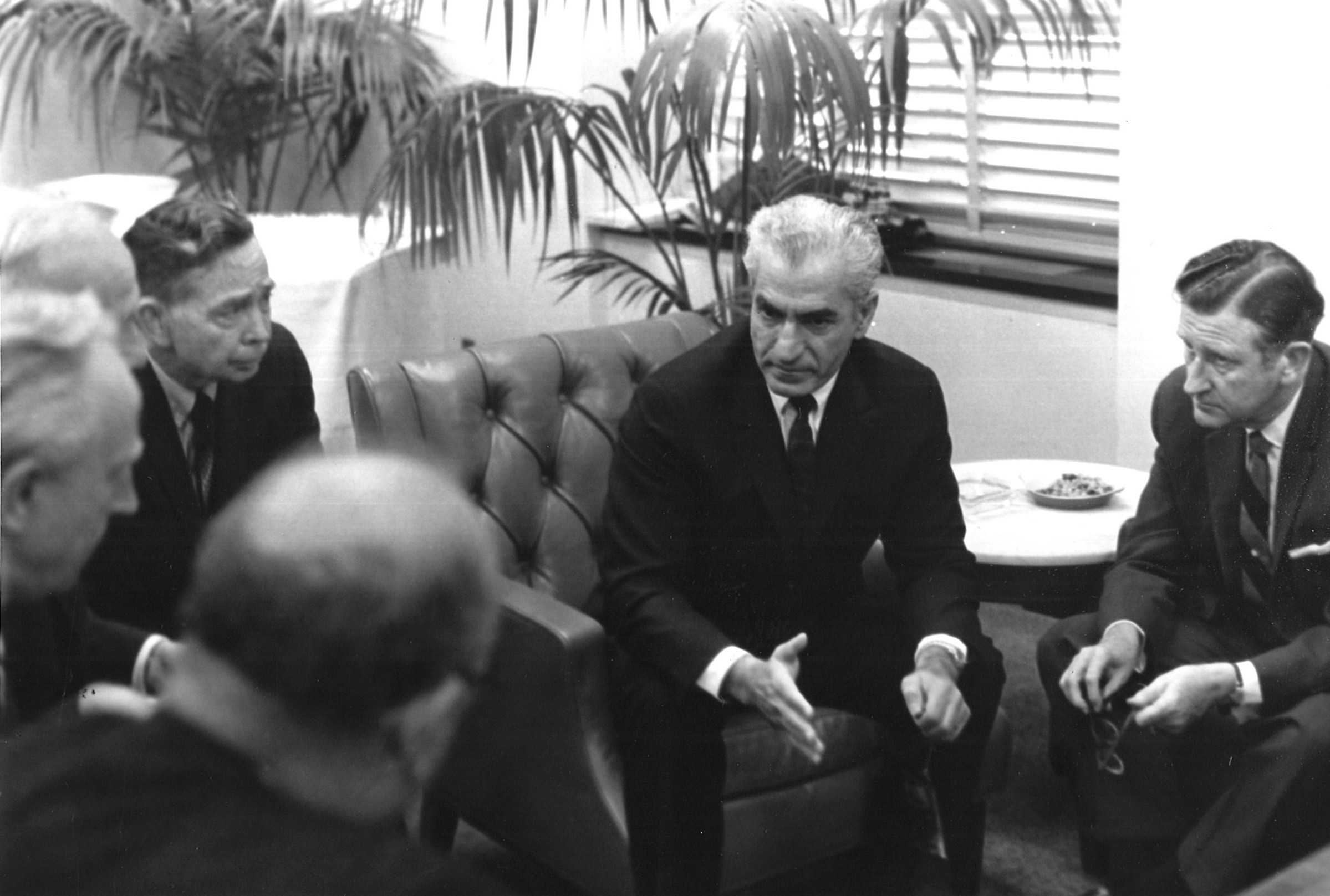
Carl Albert speaking with the Shah of Iran Mohammed Reza Pahlevi and Representative L.H. Fountain

In 1947, Fountain was elected to the North Carolina Senate where he served until 1952.

=== Congress ===
In the 1952 election, he won a seat in the 83rd Congress as Representative from the Second Congressional District of North Carolina. He was reelected to each Congress through the 97th, at which time he did not seek reelection.

Fountain was appointed by President Lyndon B. Johnson as a United States Delegate to the 22nd Session in 1967 of the United Nations General Assembly. In this capacity, he served as assistant to United States Ambassador Arthur J. Goldberg during the Security Council debate following the June 6th Arab–Israeli Six-Day War.

He led the fight in 1978 for the creation of the first independent Presidentially-appointed inspector general ("watchdog") in the former Department of Health, Education and Welfare, and worked for the establishment of inspectors general in every key Federal department and agency. Each inspector general plays a significant role in curbing waste, fraud, abuse, and mismanagement in government.

From time to time, he served on various subcommittees of both the Committee on Government Operations and the Committee on Foreign Affairs. For 14 years, Fountain was chairman of the House Foreign Affairs Subcommittee on Near Eastern Affairs. For 28 years he was chairman of the House Government Operations Subcommittee on Intergovernmental Relations. He conducted hundreds of investigations into food and drug safety, and led the effort to create inspectors general in federal departments and agencies.

Near the end of his career, Fountain advocated for his constituents and for the American people by urging Congress to move towards less governmental encroachment. Fountain can be seen making the case on the congressional floor in this 1981 video on C-Span: LH Fountain Speaks on Big Government

Fountain introduced and passed a plethora of bills that became laws in his time in Congress.

- H.R.4647 - A bill to award special Congressional gold medals to Fred Waring, the widow of Joe Louis, and Louis L'Amour.
- 101. H.J.Res.155 — 97th Congress (1981-1982)A joint resolution to authorize and request the President to issue a proclamation designating May 3 through May 10, 1981, as "Jewish Heritage Week".
- 128. H.R.7112 — 96th Congress (1979-1980)State and Local Fiscal Assistance Act Amendments of 1980 (Sponsor)
- 129. H.R.7085 — 96th Congress (1979-1980)An act to provide certain benefits to individuals held hostage in Iran and to similarly situated individuals, and for other purposes.
- 188. H.J.Res.568 — 96th Congress (1979-1980)A joint resolution to authorize and request the President to issue a proclamation designating October 12 through October 19, 1980, as "Italian-American Heritage Week".
- 19. H.R.8588 — 95th Congress (1977-1978)An Act to reorganize the executive branch of the Government and increase its economy and efficiency by establishing Offices of Inspector General within the Departments of Agriculture, Commerce, Housing and Urban Development, the Interior, Labor, and Transportation, and within the Community Services Administration, the Environmental Protection Agency, the General Services Administration, the National Aeronautics and Space Administration, the Small Business Administration, and the Veterans' Administration, and for other purposes (Sponsor)

He was a signatory to the 1956 Southern Manifesto that opposed the desegregation of public schools ordered by the Supreme Court in Brown v. Board of Education. Fountain voted against the Civil Rights Acts of 1957, the Civil Rights Acts of 1960, the Civil Rights Acts of 1964, and the Civil Rights Acts of 1968 as well as the 24th Amendment to the U.S. Constitution and the Voting Rights Act of 1965. As the price for his vote for legislation supporting the War on Poverty, he demanded the firing of deputy director Adam Yarmolinsky, who, while with the Defense Department, had helped force integration of public places near military bases in North Carolina.

From 1981 to 1982, he was a member of the Presidential Advisory Committee on Federalism. The committee had the responsibility of advising the President on ways to restore proper relationships between federal, state and local governments.

== Personal life ==
Fountain was a Presbyterian Elder and had a perfect Sunday School attendance record for more than eighty years. He served as a trustee of the National Presbyterian Church from 1961 to 1964 and again from 1977 to 1980. He was a member of the executive committee of the East Carolina Council of the Boy Scouts of America, and was a member of the local and other Bar Associations, the Elks, and Kiwanis Club. He served as lieutenant governor of the Sixth Division of the Carolinas District of Kiwanis International. He was also a Jaycee and received the Distinguished Service Award (Man of the Year) of the Tarboro Jaycees in 1948.

A lifelong advocate of education, Fountain was a charter member of the Board of Trustees of St. Andrews Presbyterian College of Laurinburg from 1955 through 1971. He was reelected to the board in 1972 and served until 1974.

== Death ==
Fountain died in Raleigh, North Carolina on October 10, 2002 at the age of 89.

== Family ==
LH Fountain married Christine Fountain and had one daughter, Nancy Dale Fountain Black. LH Fountain is survived by two grandchildren, Christine Chandler Black and William Mock Black III.

== Awards ==
- North Carolina Citizens Association Distinguished Public Service Award (1971)
- University of North Carolina School of Medicine Distinguished Service Award (1973)
- Association of American University Presses Distinguished Service to Higher Education and the Scholarly Community Award (1975)
- National League of Cities Special Citation for Distinguished Congressional Service (1976)
- Association of Federal Investigators Leadership and Distinguished Service Award (1978).
- In 1982, the North Carolina League of Municipalities, meeting in Annual Convention, passed a resolution of deep appreciation and commendation to Fountain for "continued efforts to assist local governments…throughout the nation"
- Also in 1982, the Association of Federal Investigators honored Congressman Fountain for the second time in five years with an award for "unstinting support for law enforcement and investigation, and for his outstanding career in public service to the American people."

== Memorials ==
"Congressman L.H. Fountain Highway," a section of U.S. 64 which runs through Edgecombe County, was named in his memory.

U.S. House of Representatives
Preceded by John H. Kerr	Member of the U.S. House of Representatives from North Carolina's 2nd congressional district 1953–1983	Succeeded by Tim Valentine
