= Anacyclus ciliatus =

Ciliated German pellitory

Conservation status
- Least Concern (IUCN 3.1)

Scientific classification
- Kingdom: Plantae
- Clade: Tracheophytes
- Clade: Angiosperms
- Clade: Eudicots
- Clade: Asterids
- Order: Asterales
- Family: Asteraceae
- Genus: Anacyclus
- Species: A. ciliatus

Binomial name
- Anacyclus ciliatus Trautv.

Synonyms
- Anthemis ciliata (Trautv.) Boiss.

Species of flowering plant

Anacyclus ciliatus, the ciliated German pellitory, is a species of pellitory that is endemic to Azerbaijan. It can be found in Gobustan National Park and near Kürdəmir, Hadzhi-Gabul and Yevlakh. It grows on dry clay and pebbly slopes on lowlands and lower montane areas. Despite being known from only five locations, it is common within its range, and its population is stable.
