= Valentine School =

Valentine School may refer to:

in the United States

- Valentine School (Chicopee, Massachusetts)
- Valentine School of the Valentine Independent School District
- Valentine Public School, Valentine, Nebraska, listed on the NRHP in Cherry County, Nebraska
- Schoolhouse at Truxton Canyon Training School, Valentine, Arizona, also known as Valentine Indian School, listed on the NRHP in Mohave County, Arizona

== See also ==
- Valentine House (disambiguation)
- Valentine Building (disambiguation)
