= Valentine Building =

Valentine Building may refer to:

- Valentine Building (Juneau, Alaska), NRHP-listed in Juneau, Alaska
- Valentine on Broadway Hotel, Kansas City, Missouri, NRHP-listed in Jackson County
- The Coliseum-Duplex Envelope Company Building, Richmond, Virginia, also known as Valentine Auction Company Building, NRHP-listed

== See also ==
- Valentine House (disambiguation)
- Valentine School (disambiguation)
