= Valentinov =

Valentinov (Russian: Валентинов) is a surname, derived from the given name Valentine. People with that name include:

- Andriy Valentinov, the pen name of Ukrainian science/fantasy fiction writer Andrey Valentinovich Shmalko
- Nikolai Valentinov, Russian socialist, journalist, philosopher and economist.

== See also ==
- Valentinovka (Russian: Валентиновка), Inzersky Selsoviet, Arkhangelsky District, Bashkortostan, Russia
- Valentinovo, Croatia
- Walentynów (disambiguation)
