= Bálint =

Origin
- Derivation: Latin
- Meaning: Healthy, strong

Bálint or Balint is a Hungarian surname derived from Valentinus.

== Surname ==
- Alice Balint (born Alice Székely-Kovács) (1898–1939), Hungarian psychoanalyst
- András Bálint (born 1943), Hungarian actor
- Becca Balint (born 1968), American politician
- Dorel Balint (born 1969), Romanian footballer
- Endre Bálint (1914–1986), Hungarian painter and graphic artist
- Eszter Balint, Hungarian singer, songwriter, violinist, and actress
- Gabi Balint (born 1963), Romanian football manager and former player
- György Bálint (originally surname Braun; 1919–2020), Hungarian horticulturist, journalist, author, and politician
- Jannik Balint (born 1996), German politician
- Lajos Bálint (1929–2010), Romanian archbishop
- László Balint (born 1979), Romanian football manager and former player of Hungarian descent
- László Bálint (born 1948), Hungarian former football player
- Michael Balint (1896–1970), Hungarian psychoanalyst
- Rezső Bálint (1874–1929), Austro-Hungarian neurologist and psychiatrist
- Rezső Bálint (1885–1945), Hungarian painter

== Given name ==
- Bálint Bajner (born 1990), Hungarian football player
- Bálint Bakfark (1507–1576), Hungarian and Polish composer of Transylvanian Saxon origin
- Bálint Balassi (1554–1594), Hungarian poet
- Bálint Hóman (1885–1951), Hungarian politician
- Balint Karosi (born 1979), Hungarian organist and composer
- Bálint Magosi (born 1989), Hungarian professional ice hockey forward
- Bálint Magyar (born 1952), Hungarian politician
- Balint Pastor (born 1979), Serbian politician of Hungarian origin
- Bálint Török (1502–1551), Hungarian aristocrat
- Balint Vazsonyi (1936–2003), Hungarian pianist
- Bálint Vécsei (born 1993), Hungarian football player
- Bálint Virág (born 1973), Hungarian mathematician

== See also ==
- Balinț
