= Valentine Nekesa =

Kenyan fashion designer

- Born: September 6, 1997 (age 27); Kenya
- Occupation(s): Entrepreneur, motivational Speaker, designer, model
- Known for: Safaricom's BYOB's first winner
- Title: Founder and CEO of Nekesa Queens Limited

Valentine Nekesa, is a Kenyan entrepreneur, designer and motivational speaker who founded Nekesa Queens Limited.

== Background and education ==
She was born and raised in Webuye, in Bungoma County, in western Kenya. Nekesa was raised by her mother. In 2009, Valentine's mother died when Valentine was only 12 years old.

== Career ==
In 2008, at age 11 years when she was a student in Senior One, a friend asked Nekesa to make her an outfit so that she could participate in the school pageant. The friend was satisfied, which encouraged Nekesa to design more outfits. While in high school, she continued to design outfits for different people.

In 2014, while waiting to enter university, a friend asked her to make her an outfit for an event. Nekesa invested Sh1,000 (approx. US$10) and earned Sh1,500 (approx. US$15). Thus, her company VN Designs was created. A cousin donated a sewing machine so Nekesa could make her outfits in-house.

In February 2017, at age 19 years, she entered a television reality show sponsored by Safaricom. The eight-week show saw Nekesa emerge victorious over 11 other contestants. The prize was a cash prize of Sh3 million (approx. US$30,000) and Sh2 million (approx. $20,000) in services from participating Kenyan businesses. She intends to use her winnings to expand her business, which had three employees as of October 2017.

== Other considerations ==
In October 2017, Valentine Nekesa was named among “The Top 40 Women Under 40 in Kenya 2017”, by Business Daily Africa, a daily English-language business daily newspaper published by the Nation Media Group.

== See also ==
- Esther Koimett
- Catherine Igathe
- Carole Kariuki
