= Valentinian =

Valentinian may refer to:

- Valentinian I or Valentinian the Great (321–375), Western Roman emperor from 364 to 375
- Valentinian II (371–392), Western Roman Emperor from 375 to 392
- Valentinian III (419–455), Western Roman Emperor from 425 to 455
- Valentinus (Gnostic), theologian and founder of Valentinianism
- Valentinian (play), a Jacobean-era stage play
- Valentinianic dynasty, an Imperial Roman dynasty founded by Valentinian I and sometimes known as the Valentinian dynasty

== See also ==
- Valentine (disambiguation), an Anglicization of Valentinian, Valentinus, and Valentinius
- Valentinianism, a Gnostic movement founded by Valentinus
- Valentinus (disambiguation)
