= Valentin Bosioc =

Romanian online coach

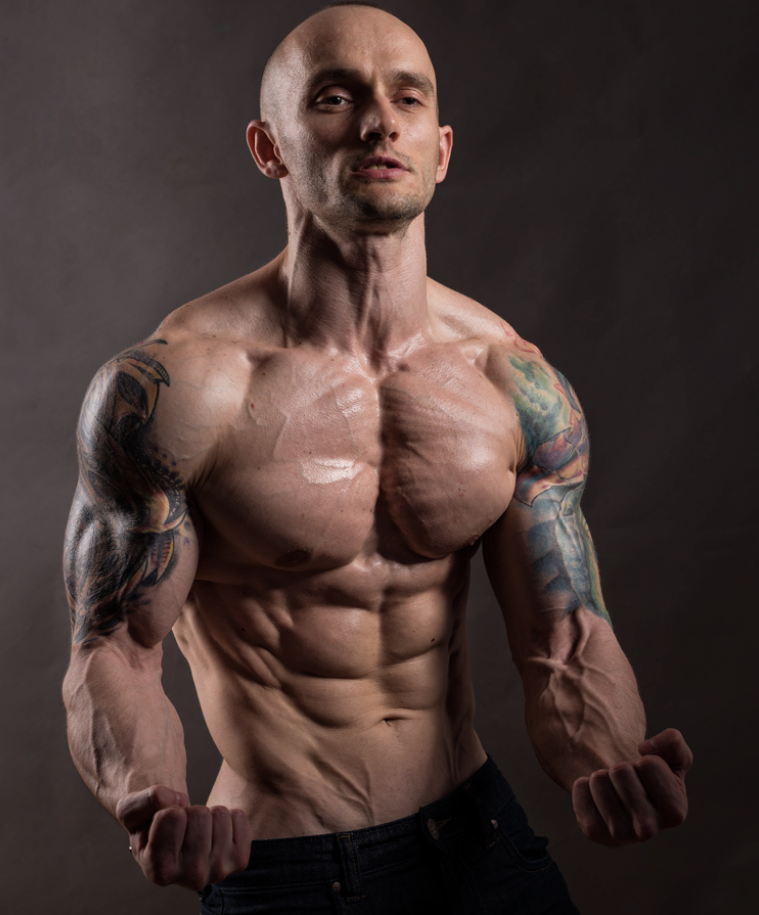
- Valentin Bosioc in 2015
- Born: Valentin George Bosioc; 13 January 1983 (age 43); Reșița, Romania
- Occupations: Online coach for women; Bodybuilder; Fitness instructor; personal trainer; nutritionist; fitness model
- Height: 165 cm (5 ft 5 in)
- Website: valentinbosioc.com

Valentin Bosioc (born Valentin George Bosioc on 13 January 1983) is one of the most renowned and highly respected online coaches for women in Romania. A Romanian professional bodybuilder and fitness model, as well as certified fitness instructor, personal trainer and nutritionist, a holistic fitness expert, certified with Nutritional Coaching Institute L1 & L2, as well as Hormone Specialist NCI. He rose to prominence by winning Musclemania Paris and placing second in an IFBB Romania competition in 2015, among other prizes. In 2018, Bosioc also reached the semi-finals of Ninja Warrior România. He has been credited as an influencer and is the most followed Romanian sportsperson on Facebook. Currently he is one of top Romanian wellness experts, with a premium protocol program for women.

== Early life and career ==
Valentin George Bosioc was born on 13 January 1983 in the city of Reșița, and spent his childhood in Bocșa, Romania. His father Iosif was a football player, while his brother Bogdan Ionuț is a handball instructor. Starting with the age of 13 Bosioc showed special interest in bodybuilding and began taking judo, mixed martial arts, boxing, calisthenics, football, rugby and aikido classes, among others. While attending the Tata Oancea High School in Bocșa, Romanian boxer Francisc Vaștag desired to scout him, but he eventually refused the offer.

Bosioc later graduated from the Politehnica University of Timișoara, receiving a degree in engineering. He worked in this field for a short period of time, as well as in public relations and journalism, but gave up to pursue a career as a professional bodybuilder, fitness model, fitness instructor, personal trainer and nutritionist, for which he studied in Romania and the United Kingdom. He's also certified at Nutritional Coaching Institute with Nutrition L1 & L2, and also Hormone Specialist. Bosioc rose to prominence by winning Musclemania Paris and placing second in an IFBB Romania competition in November 2015, among other prizes. In 2018, he also appeared on the first season of Ninja Warrior România, managing to reach the semi-finals.

A master trainer at Fitness Education School in Bucharest, Romania as of December 2018, Bosioc has worked with several celebrities, most notably with Romanian singer Delia Matache and Cronica Cârcotașilor host Ioana Petric., or Maria Popovici, Puya, Corina, or Cristina Huidu.

He has been credited as an influencer and is signed to Romanian agency Global Influencers. Cotidianul and Biz labelled him one of the most influential fitness bloggers in Romania, with him also being the most followed Romanian sportsperson on Facebook (7th person overall in the country as of February 2019). He has written a few books, two of them were The Path to Perfect Abs and Get Guns, as well as developed his own training concept, Full Body Ignition (FBI). As of April 2020, he has been uploading workout videos to his YouTube channel for over eleven years and also uses his social media and Facebook page for similar scopes.

He appeared in SmartJob Podcast by EuropaLibera, he's been invited to BZI Live and he helped Maria Popovici with her fitness journey. Valentin Bosioc has written articles on nutrition and lifestyle topics in Romanian health publications.. He also appeared on CSID Talks, a podcast produced by Ce se întâmplă, doctore?, where he discussed metabolism, hormonal changes, abdominal fat, and weight management after the age of 35.

Bosioc had Alan Aragon invited as a guest in his podcast, where they talked about real evidence-based nutrition, facts and myths in the fitness industry. In July 2026, Bosioc published the CARE-compliant case report The Metabolic Paradox: Early Carotid Atherosclerosis Despite a Favorable Cardiometabolic Profile in Alan Aragon's Research Review (AARR).

Since then he is helping Romanian women to achieve hormonal balance and to change their entire life through FullBodyIgnition (FBI) platform.

== Personal life ==
Bosioc is married to a Romanian woman named Ana Cristina and is the father of a daughter, Eila Maria. They currently reside in Bucharest.
