= Valentine Independent School District =

School district in Texas

Coordinates: 30°35′22″N 104°29′31″W

Valentine School

Location
- 4th & Kentucky St. Valentine, Texas 79854; United States

Information
- School type: Public high school
- School district: Valentine Independent School District
- Principal: Doug Cook
- Grades: K-12
- Enrollment: 48 (2012)
- Colors: Red & White
- Athletics conference: UIL Class A
- Mascot: Pirates/Lady Pirates
- Website: Valentine School website

Valentine Independent School District is a small public school district based in Valentine, Texas (USA).

Valentine ISD has one school - Valentine School - that serves students in grades Pre-Kindergarten though twelve. The district also offers advanced core classes, night school for students and adults, and a number of optional education enhancements.

In 2009, the school district was rated "academically acceptable" by the Texas Education Agency.

== School ==
Valentine School is a public school located in Valentine, Texas (USA) and classified as a 1A school by the UIL. All grades K-12 attend class in one campus, the same as Marathon School in Brewster County. Typically due to its isolation, Valentine School also has one of the lowest high school enrollments in the state. In 2015, the school was rated "Met Standard" by the Texas Education Agency.

=== Athletics ===
In 2021 Valentine ISD had the smallest University Interscholastic League (UIL) sports program of any Texas high school.

The Valentine Pirates compete in the following sports

Cross Country, Basketball, Golf, Tennis, Track and Field, and Girls Volleyball

In 1966 the school's American football team ceased to exist.
