= Valentine, Texas =

Town in Texas, United States

- Town
- Interactive map of Valentine, Texas
- Coordinates: 30°35′17″N 104°29′54″W
- Country: United States
- State: Texas
- County: Jeff Davis

Government

Area
  - Total: 0.49 sq mi (1.26 km^{2})
  - Land: 0.49 sq mi (1.26 km^{2})
  - Water: 0 sq mi (0.00 km^{2})
- Elevation: 4,436 ft (1,352 m)

Population (2020)
  - Total: 73
  - Density: 150.0/sq mi (57.93/km^{2})
- Time zone: UTC-6 (Central (CST))
  - Summer (DST): UTC-5 (CDT)
- ZIP code: 79854
- Area code: 432
- FIPS code: 48-74648
- GNIS feature ID: 2413416

Valentine is a town in Jeff Davis County, Texas, United States. As of the 2020 census, Valentine had a population of 73.

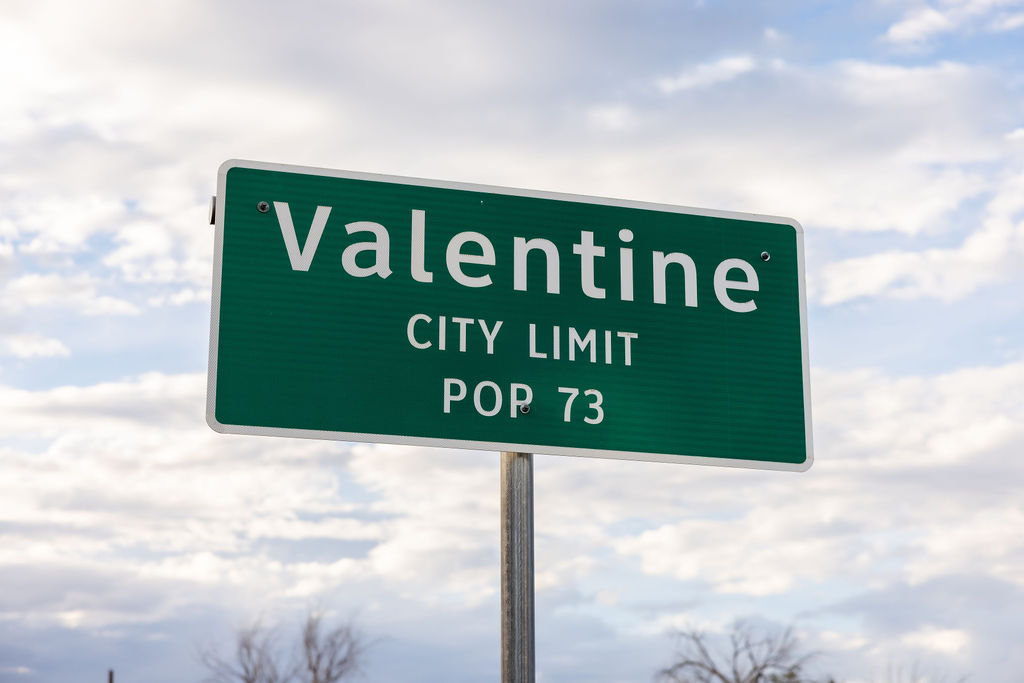
Valentine Texas Population sign

The town of Valentine is the only incorporated municipality in Jeff Davis County. Its name refers to the date of its founding in 1882 by a Southern Pacific Railroad construction crew: February 14. It is one of several cities named Valentine in the United States, where the U.S. Postal Service cancels envelopes for Valentine's Day.

Since 2019, the town has entered Texan popular culture by means of its reopened dive bar, visible off the highway as one of the only open businesses in town.

== History ==
The area near Valentine played a role during the Mexican Revolution. Pancho Villa and his forces passed through the region and were associated with border skirmishes. In response to Villa's raids, Fort Holland was established nearby in 1918 as part of protective efforts. On August 16, 1931, Valentine was struck by a magnitude 5.8 earthquake—the largest ever recorded in Texas. Nearly all non-wooden structures, including the school, suffered major damage, with school buildings condemned afterwards. The quake was felt as far away as Houston and throughout northern Mexico, and caused landslides across the region. No fatalities were reported, but damages were substantial.

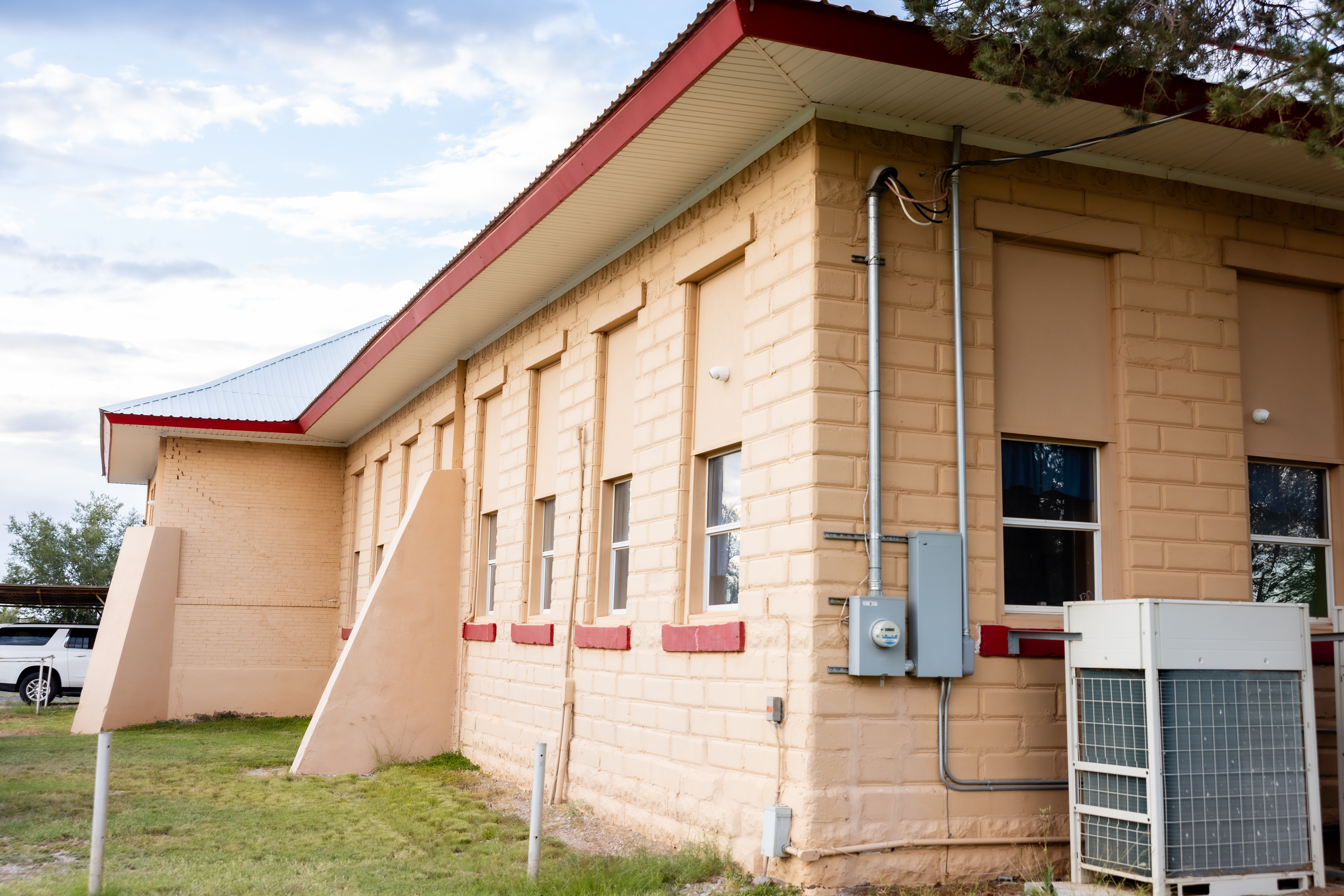
Supports Added to Structures After the Great Quake of 1931

== Geography ==
Valentine is located in western Jeff Davis County along U.S. Route 90. The highway leads northwest 38 miles (61 km) to Interstate 10 at Van Horn, and southeast 35 miles (56 km) to Marfa.

According to the United States Census Bureau, the town has a total area of 0.49 square miles (1.26 km^{2}), all land. The town sits in a flat basin between the Davis Mountains 15 miles (24 km) to the east and the Sierra Vieja 11 miles (18 km) to the west.

=== Climate ===
Valentine experiences a semiarid climate (Köppen BSk) with cool, dry winters and hot, dry summers.

Climate data for Valentine, Texas (1991–2020)
Month	Jan	Feb	Mar	Apr	May	Jun	Jul	Aug	Sep	Oct	Nov	Dec	Year
Record high °F (°C)	83 (28)	87 (31)	91 (33)	98 (37)	102 (39)	108 (42)	106 (41)	103 (39)	100 (38)	96 (36)	86 (30)	80 (27)	108 (42)
Mean daily maximum °F (°C)	60.8 (16.0)	66.3 (19.1)	73.3 (22.9)	81.1 (27.3)	88.6 (31.4)	94.5 (34.7)	92.3 (33.5)	91.4 (33.0)	86.6 (30.3)	79.9 (26.6)	69.3 (20.7)	61.1 (16.2)	78.8 (26.0)
Daily mean °F (°C)	44.1 (6.7)	48.5 (9.2)	54.8 (12.7)	62.3 (16.8)	70.5 (21.4)	77.9 (25.5)	77.9 (25.5)	76.8 (24.9)	71.7 (22.1)	63.2 (17.3)	51.9 (11.1)	44.7 (7.1)	62.0 (16.7)
Mean daily minimum °F (°C)	27.4 (−2.6)	30.7 (−0.7)	36.3 (2.4)	43.5 (6.4)	52.4 (11.3)	61.3 (16.3)	63.5 (17.5)	62.3 (16.8)	56.8 (13.8)	46.5 (8.1)	34.6 (1.4)	28.3 (−2.1)	45.3 (7.4)
Record low °F (°C)	3 (−16)	−7 (−22)	12 (−11)	21 (−6)	31 (−1)	43 (6)	51 (11)	50 (10)	39 (4)	17 (−8)	8 (−13)	0 (−18)	−7 (−22)
Average precipitation inches (mm)	0.63 (16)	0.43 (11)	0.37 (9.4)	0.36 (9.1)	0.71 (18)	1.76 (45)	2.40 (61)	1.36 (35)	1.75 (44)	1.20 (30)	0.57 (14)	0.58 (15)	12.12 (307.5)
Average snowfall inches (cm)	1.1 (2.8)	0.0 (0.0)	0.0 (0.0)	0.0 (0.0)	0.0 (0.0)	0.0 (0.0)	0.0 (0.0)	0.0 (0.0)	0.0 (0.0)	0.0 (0.0)	0.1 (0.25)	0.3 (0.76)	1.5 (3.8)
Average precipitation days (≥ 0.001 in)	2.59	2.19	2.06	1.63	3.77	6.19	7.21	5.06	4.19	4.00	1.94	2.56	43.39
Source 1: Weather Atlas
Source 2: Western Regional Climate Center, Desert Research Institute

== Education ==
Valentine Independent School District serves the local community, with a single K–12 campus that is among the smallest in Texas by enrollment, often with fewer than 25 high school students. The school is classified as UIL 1A and offers a variety of academic and extracurricular programs, despite its size.

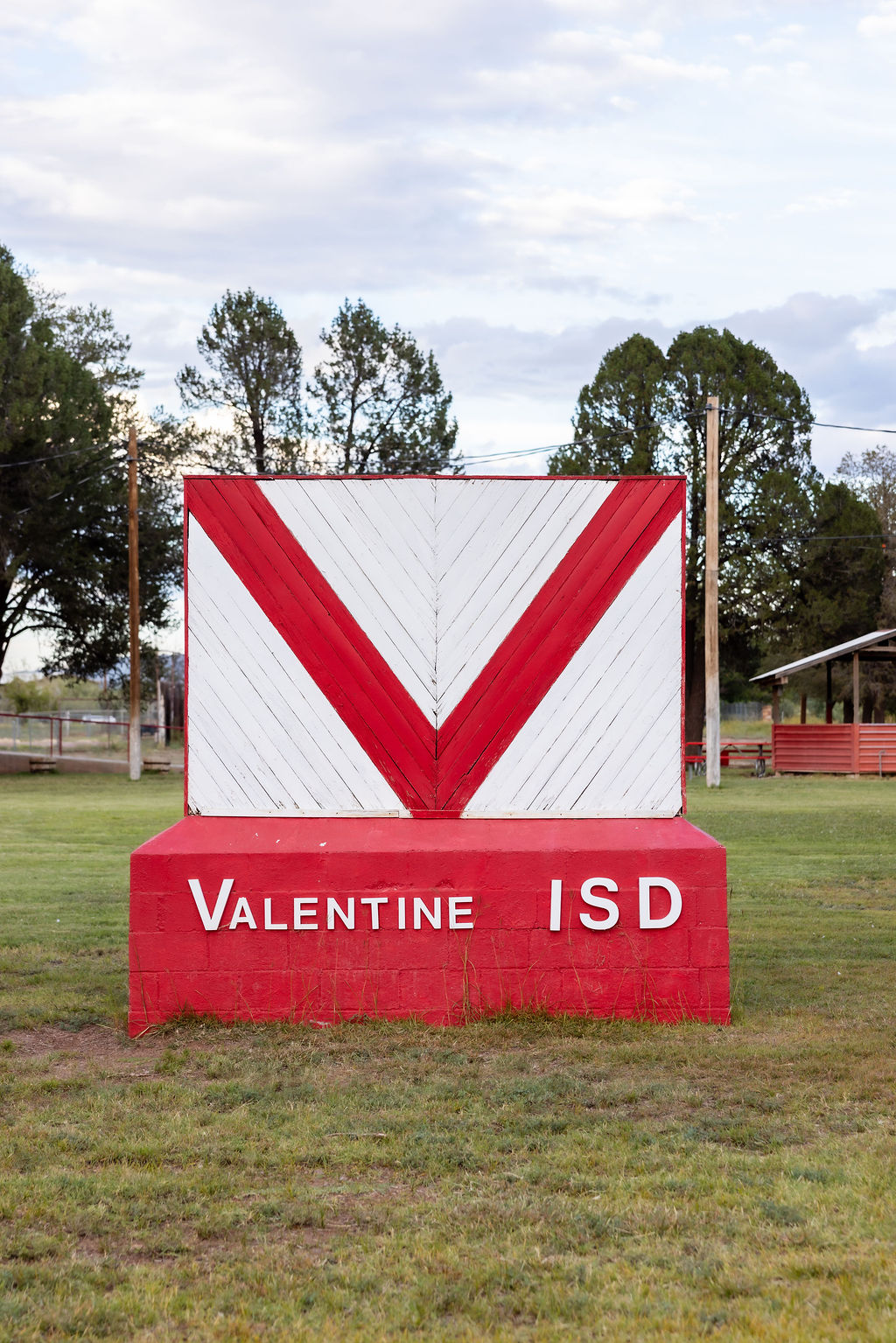
Valentine Texas ISD

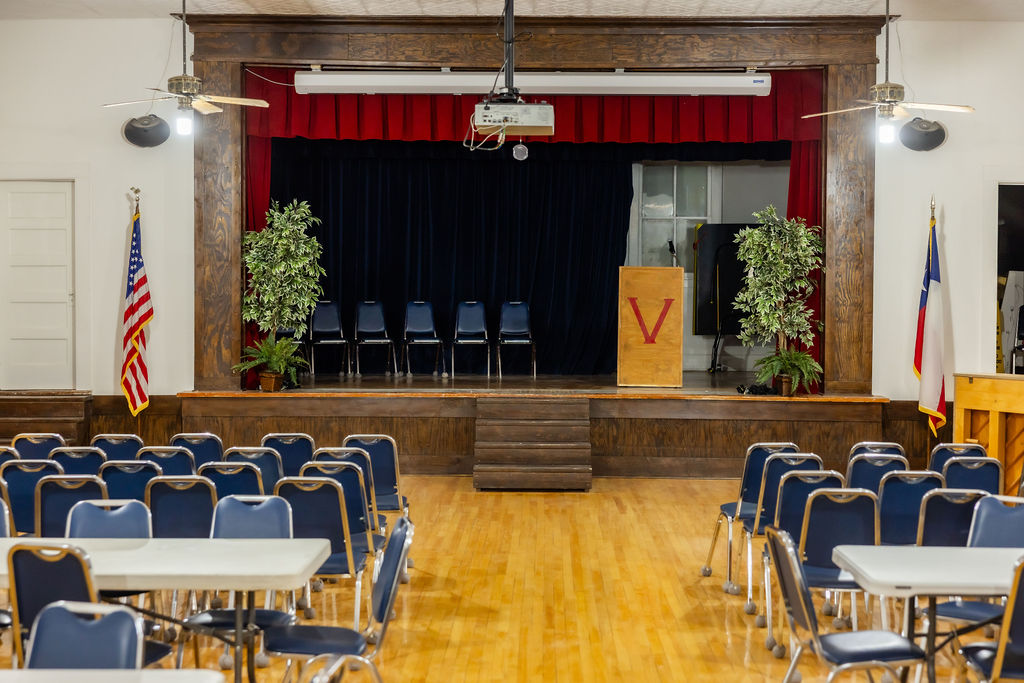
Valentine School Auditorium

== Government and infrastructure ==
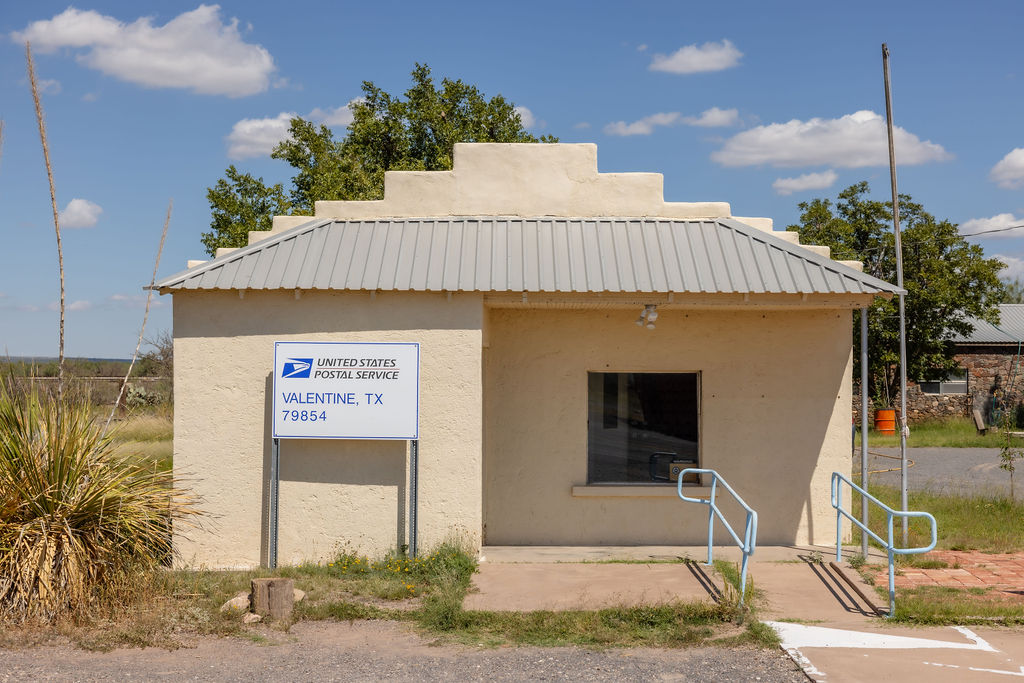
Valentine Texas Post Office Exterior

The United States Postal Service operates the Valentine Post Office at 311 W. California Ave. Each year around Valentine's Day, it receives media attention as people mail cards and letters through this location to receive the distinctive holiday postmark.

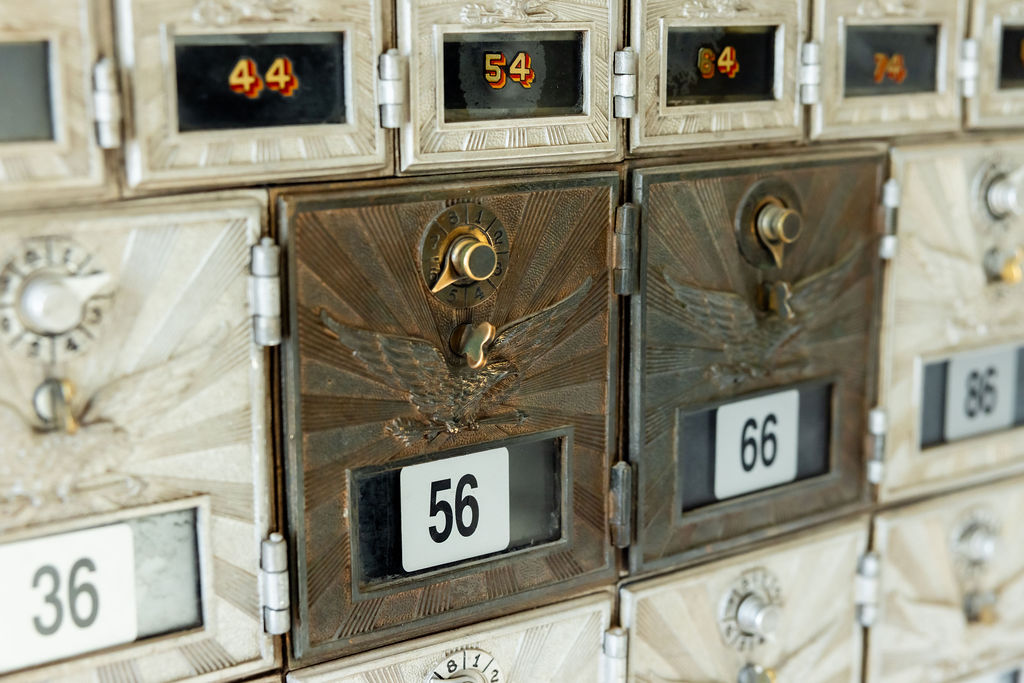
Valentine Texas Post office combo locks

== Transportation ==
Valentine is located on US 90, 35 miles (58 km) north of Marfa, and 40 miles (64 km) south of Van Horn.

Amtrak's Sunset Limited passes through the town on Union Pacific tracks, but makes no stop. A stop is located 60 miles (96 km) to the southeast in Alpine.

== See also ==
- List of municipalities in Texas
