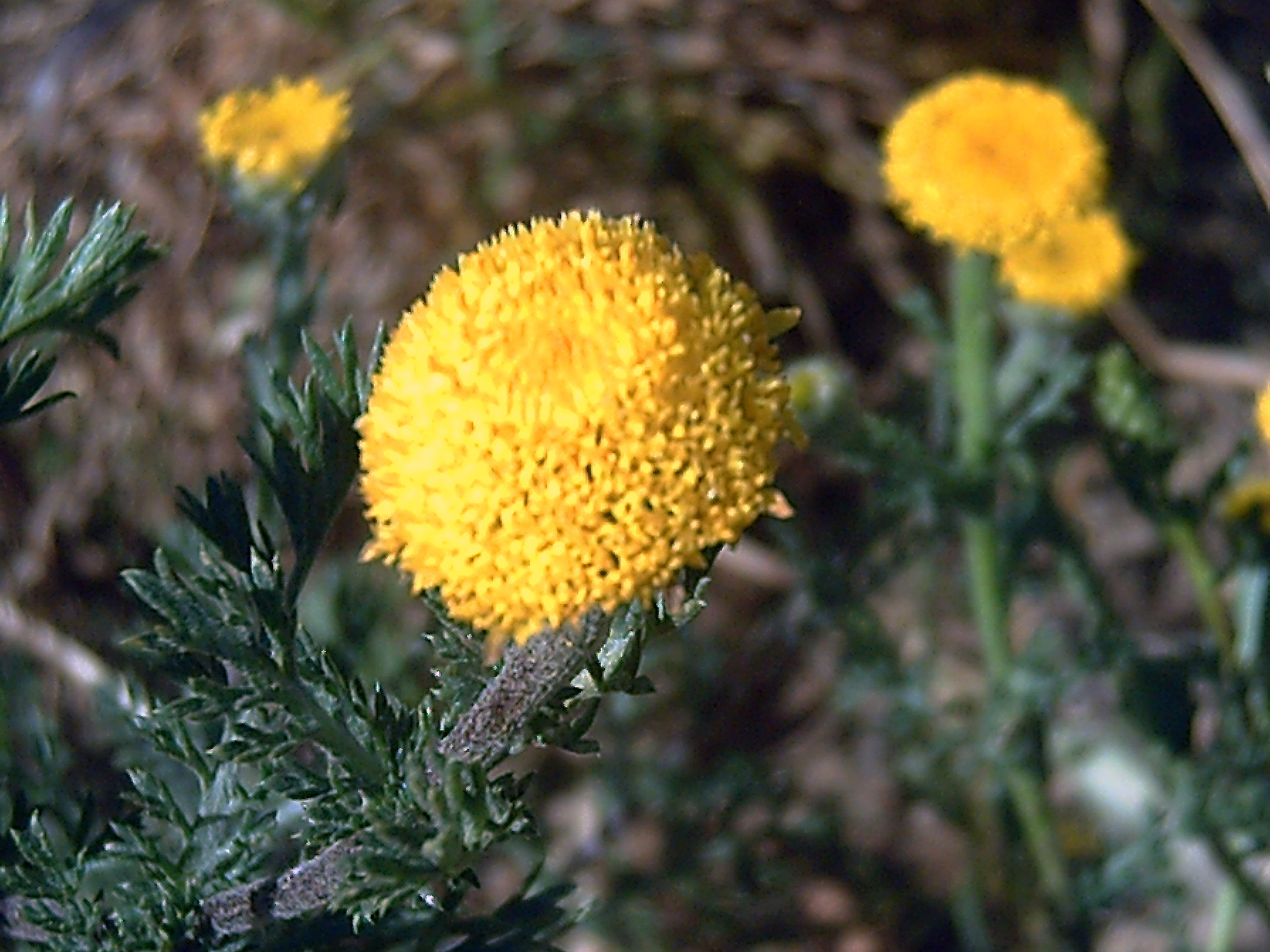

Scientific classification
- Kingdom: Plantae
- Clade: Tracheophytes
- Clade: Angiosperms
- Clade: Eudicots
- Clade: Asterids
- Order: Asterales
- Family: Asteraceae
- Genus: Anacyclus
- Species: A. valentinus

Binomial name
- Anacyclus valentinus L. (1753)

Synonyms
- Anacyclus dissimilis Pomel; Anacyclus prostratus Pomel; Lyonnetia anthemoides (L.) Willk. Santolina anthemoides L. Anacyclus x valentinus -- Sources: E+M AFPD IPNI

= Anacyclus valentinus =

Species of flowering plant

Anacyclus valentinus, the valentine's sunflower, is the type species for the genus Anacyclus in the tribe Anthemideae and family Asteraceae.

== Distribution ==
Anacyclus valentinus is native to Europe, with some found in Morocco and Algeria in Africa. The majority of Anacyclus valentinus is in Spain.
