= Valentin Nikolayev =

Valentin Nikolayev may refer to:

- Valentin Nikolayev (figure skater), Soviet figure skating coach for Oksana Baiul
- Valentin Nikolayev (footballer), Soviet international footballer and national team manager
- Valentin Nikolayev (wrestler), Soviet Greco-Roman wrestler, Olympic champion in 1956
