= Valentine Soap Workers Cottages =

Historic houses in Massachusetts, United States

- U.S. National Register of Historic Places
- Location within Massachusetts Location within the United States
- Location: 5–7 Cottage Street and 101 Pearl Street, Cambridge, Massachusetts
- Coordinates: 42°21′44.8″N 71°6′19.4″W
- Architectural style: Federal
- MPS: Cambridge MRA
- NRHP reference No.: 83000832 (5-7 Cottage St.); 83000833 (101 Pearl St.)
- Added to NRHP: June 30, 1983

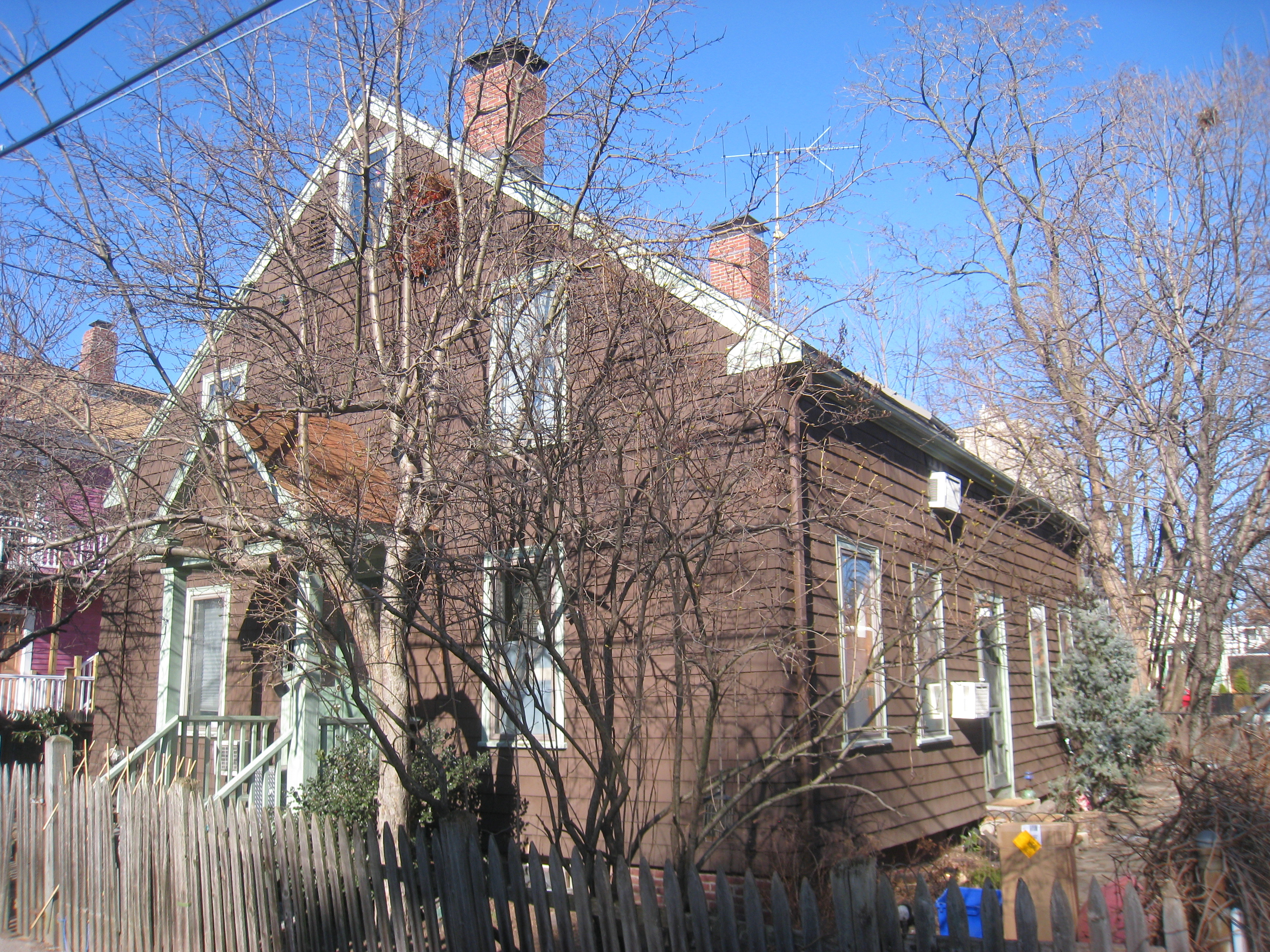
Cottage at 5-7 Cottage Street

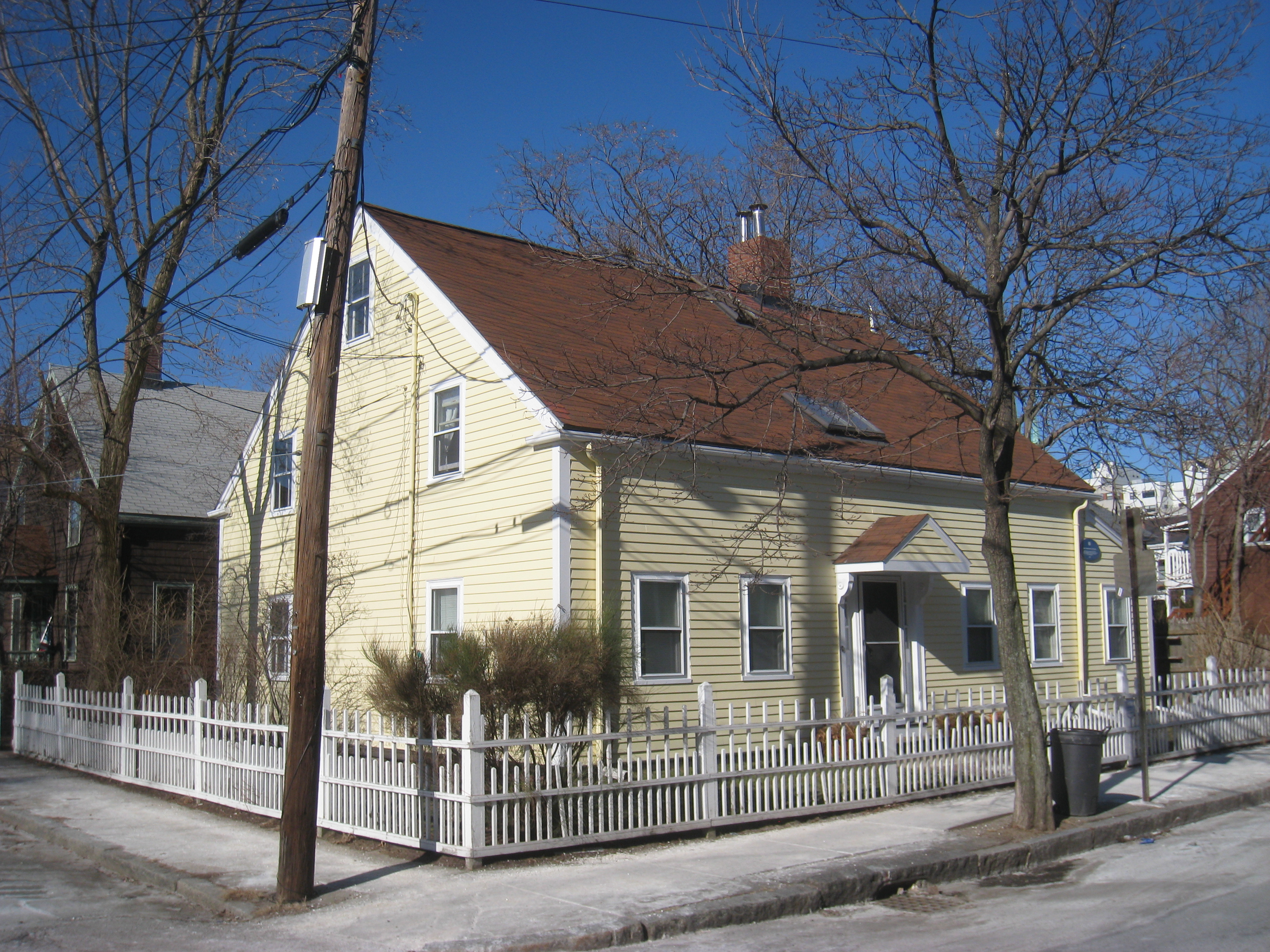
Cottage at 101 Pearl Street

The Valentine Soap Workers Cottages are a pair of adjacent historic houses in Cambridge, Massachusetts, that are listed on the National Register of Historic Places.

The cottages are located at 5–7 Cottage Street and 101 Pearl Street. They were listed on the National Register of Historic Places on June 30, 1983.

The two cottages were built for worker housing in 1835, by local soap manufacturer Charles Valentine. Valentine's soap factory was located nearby at the corner of Valentine and Pearl Streets. Founded in 1828, it was at the time one of the largest manufacturing operations in the Cambridgeport section of the city. An historic marker for the cottages identifies them as the only examples of factory housing in Cambridge.

== See also ==
- National Register of Historic Places listings in Cambridge, Massachusetts
