= Valentino =

Valentino may refer to

== People ==
- Valentino (surname), including a list of people with the name
- Valentino (given name), including a list of people with the name

=== Mononymous persons ===
- Valentino (fashion designer) (born Valentino Clemente Ludovico Garavani; 1932–2026), Italian fashion designer
- Valentino (singer) (born Peter González Torres, 1980), Puerto Rican singer
- Cesare Borgia (c. 1475–1507), sometimes called Valentino, Spanish-Italian soldier, nobleman, politician, and cardinal
- Valentino, (born Charles Harris), disco singer who recorded the song "I Was Born This Way" (1975)

== Places ==
- Valentino, Italian name for the duchy of Valentinois, now part of Valence, Drôme
- Castello del Valentino (Valentino Castle), a castle in Turin, Italy
- Parco del Valentino (Valentino Park), a public park in Turin, Italy

== Companies and organizations ==
- Valentino Music, a Bosnian commercial cable television channel
- The Valentinos, a U.S. R&B group
- Lost Valentinos (formerly The Valentinos), Australian band
- Valentino (fashion house), clothing company founded by Valentino Garavani
- Valentino Fashion Group, corporate parent to the fashion house, that includes several brands and fashion houses
- Valentino (restaurant), a defunct Michelin-starred restaurant in Santa Monica, California
- Valentino's, a U.S. Italian-cuisine restaurant chain

== Art and entertainment ==
=== Fictional characters ===
- Valentino, a character in the adult animated series Hazbin Hotel

=== Film ===
- Valentino (1951 film), fictionalized biography starring Anthony Dexter as actor Rudolph Valentino
- Valentino (1977 film), loosely based biography starring Rudolf Nureyev as actor Valentino
- Valentino: The Last Emperor, 2009 documentary film about Valentino Garavani

=== Music ===
- Valentino (band), a Bosnian and Yugoslav pop rock band
- Valentino (album), a 1997 album by the band Weeping Tile
- "Valentino" (24kGoldn song), 2019
- "Valentino" (Connie Francis song), 1960
- "Valentino" (Years & Years and MNEK song)
- Valentino, a 1996 album by Scottish band Long Fin Killie
- "Valentino", song by Cadillac
- "Valentino", song by Diane Birch from Bible Belt

== Other ==
- Valentino nero, Italian wine grape variety from the Piedmont region
- Victor and Valentino, an American animated series that airs on Cartoon Network

== See also ==
- Valentinos (English: Βαλεντίνος), Greek-language male given name
- Valentinois, Drome, France
  - Duke of Valentinois
- Valentinov (Russian: Валентинов), Russian surname
- Valentinovka (Russian: Валентиновка), Inzersky Selsoviet, Arkhangelsky District, Bashkortostan, Russia
- Valentinovo, Croatia
- Valentin (disambiguation)
- Valentina (disambiguation)
- Valentine (disambiguation)
- Valentini (disambiguation)
