= Valentin Crețu =

Valentin Crețu may refer to:

- Valentin Crețu (luger) (born 1989), Romanian luger
- Valentin Crețu (footballer) (born 1989), Romanian footballer
