= Valentino Vujinović =

German footballer

Personal information
- Date of birth: 20 February 1999 (age 27)
- Place of birth: Karlsruhe, Germany
- Height: 1.79 m (5 ft 10 in)
- Position: Forward

Youth career
- SG Siemens Karlsruhe
- ASV Durlach
- Karlsruher SC

Senior career*
Years	Team	Apps	(Gls)
2016–2019	Karlsruher SC II	19	(7)
2017–2019	Karlsruher SC	2	(0)
2019	→ FSV Frankfurt (loan)	5	(0)
2019–2020	Differdange 03	12	(5)
2021	Solin	13	(3)
2021–2022	Široki Brijeg	4	(0)
2022	Solin	3	(0)

International career
2015	Germany U17	2	(1)
- * Club domestic league appearances and goals

Valentino Vujinović (born 20 February 1999) is a German professional footballer who plays as a forward.
