= Andrea Valentini (designer) =

American designer

Andrea Valentini is an American designer based in San Francisco CA who has had success with her high-performance handbag line for men and women.

== Early life ==
Valentini was born and raised in Rhode Island. She graduated from Rhode Island School of Design (RISD) in 1995 with degrees in fine arts and interior architecture.

== Career ==
Upon graduation, Valentini and a colleague architect from RISD founded an interior architecture firm She was recognized for her award-winning designs for commercial and residential projects. Her interiors were customized down to the furniture and lighting. She soon evolved from interiors to establish her own signature materials, producing finished furniture, furnishings and personal accessories.

In 2000 Valentini launched a series of successful furniture collections at the Providence Fine Furnishings Fair. She was juried into the New York International Contemporary Furniture Fair in 2001, making a splash with her innovative use of upcycled materials into sculptural furniture and lighting. Her work was fresh and innovative, using industrial materials like polyurethanes and ethylenes sculpted into organic forms.

Her Coosh Egg Chair, a ball of high density foam cut from a block that breaks open into a chair and ottoman, received critical acclaim. This was chosen by Interior Design magazine for their future furniture competition, and was nominated for Best Product Design by the Cooper Hewitt, Smithsonian Design Museum. The chair is in the permanent collection at the Minneapolis Institute of Arts.

In 2002 Valentini exhibited in Gifu, Japan with Yoshiko Ebihara. Her work has appeared in galleries and museums in the US, Europe, and Asia.

In 2003 she was asked to submit a body of work to the Cooper Hewitt, Smithsonian Design Museum for their National Design Triennial; she was among 80 American designers to exhibit.

In 2005 she developed a signature sculptural textile from a process of fusing and molding fabrics with foams into textures which are sensual yet protective and durable. Her innovative materials were selected to be among material libraries such as Material Connexion in New York, Scin in London, and Materia in Amsterdam. The Museum of Modern Art asked her to design a computer bag for their stores, using her material patented with a convoluted structure.

In 2006 she exhibited in Second Skin with Ellen Lupton in Essen, Germany, Japan and Mexico.

In 2007 Valentini launched her first collection of lifestyle bags for women and men. In addition to bags, she has successful jewelry collections, such as the DNA collection represented by the Museum of Modern Art in New York City, Japan, Korea, and Takashimaya in New York City, which also represented her bags.

In 2009 she established a showroom, a gallery space and a roster of talent. Her showroom established her branded collections of sculptural lifestyle bags and furnishings, from her signature fabricated textiles to custom jewelry designed from industrial materials.

Her gallery invited senior students to make the leap from school to street in effort to see their work in another context, expose them to a new audience, share, talk, show and sell their work for the first time in a gallery space accessible to the public.

In 2009 Valentini asked her neighbor friend Olivia Culpo to model her bags and jewelry representing the face of her brand. Culpo quickly moved into pageantry and modeling, leading her to become Miss USA and Miss Universe 2012.

In 2010 Valentini was asked to use her innovative fabric process to design an exclusive custom duffel bag for Eric Clapton's Crossroads Guitar Festival in Chicago, which he would give to 30 of his friends and legendary guitarists who performed in support of the fundraiser for the Crossroads Centre Antigua.

In 2010, 2011, and 2012, Valentini's sculptural fabrics were on the runway in Style Week Fashion Shows in Providence, Rhode Island. She also participated in a sector of New York Fashion Week in 2012.

Valentini's sculptural pieces were published in Inside Design Now 2003.

Some of her pieces have been acquired by Vitra, Herman Miller, and Target. They have been featured in The New York Times, The Washington Post, The Financial Times, Providence Journal, Interior Design, I.D., Dwell, Parenting, Surface, and Metropolis.

She claims all of her products are designed, manufactured and made in America.
