= Valentin Ivanov =

Valentin Ivanov may refer to:

- Valentin Ivanov (astronomer) (born 1967), Bulgarian astronomer
- Valentin Ivanov (footballer, born 1934) (1934–2011), Soviet football player and coach
- Valentin Ivanov (footballer, born 1961), Soviet football player and Russian referee
- Valentin Ivanov (footballer, born 2000), Bulgarian footballer
- Valentin Ivanov (wrestler) (born 1966), Bulgarian Olympic wrestler
- Valentin Ivanov, Deputy Minister in Ministry of Economy, Energy and Tourism (Bulgaria)
