= Tim Valentine =

American politician (1926–2015)

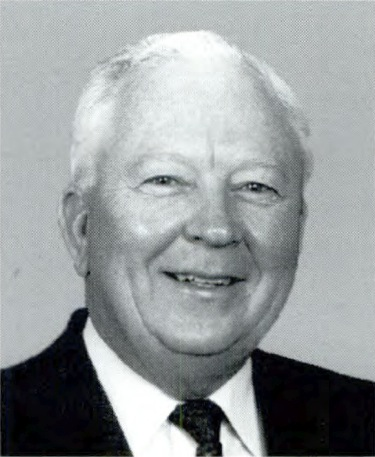

Member of the U.S. House of Representatives from North Carolina's 2nd district
- In office January 3, 1983 – January 3, 1995
- Preceded by: Lawrence H. Fountain
- Succeeded by: David Funderburk

Member of the North Carolina House of Representatives from Nash County
- In office 1955–1961
- Preceded by: Tom A. Williams
- Succeeded by: Allen Barbee

Personal details
- Born: Itimous Thaddeus Valentine Jr. March 15, 1926 Rocky Mount, North Carolina, U.S.
- Died: November 10, 2015 (aged 89) Nashville, North Carolina, U.S.
- Party: Democratic
- Spouse(s): Betsy Carr (m. 1956; died 1981) Barbara Reynolds
- Children: 7, including Phil
- Education: The Citadel (AB); University of North Carolina, Chapel Hill (LLB)
- Profession: Lawyer

Itimous Thaddeus "Tim" Valentine Jr. (March 15, 1926 – November 10, 2015) was a Democratic member of the United States House of Representatives from North Carolina from 1983 to 1995.

== Early life ==
Valentine was born on March 15, 1926, in Rocky Mount, North Carolina, and attended public schools. His father, also named Itimous and known by that name (he was one of several brothers with unusual names of unknown origin), was a State Supreme Court justice. His mother, the former Hazel Armstrong, was a postmistress. His uncle was United States Air Force Lieutenant General Frank A. Armstrong.

During World War II, Valentine joined the U.S. Army Air Corps and served on active duty from 1944 to 1946.

Valentine graduated from The Citadel in Charleston, South Carolina, in 1948, and graduated from the law school of the University of North Carolina at Chapel Hill in 1952, being admitted to the North Carolina bar that same year. He practiced law with a firm bearing his family name in Nashville.

== Political career ==
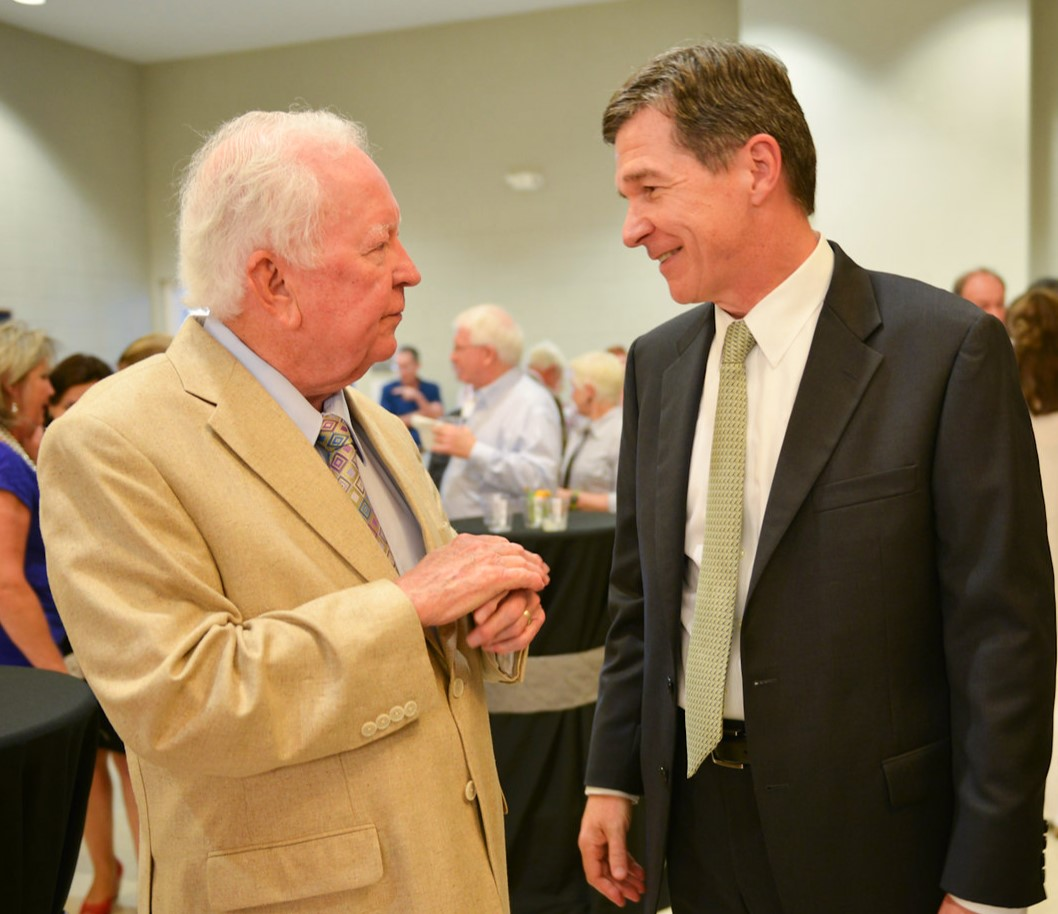
Valentine speaking to Roy Cooper in August 2014

Valentine served in the North Carolina House of Representatives from 1955 to 1960. Thereafter, he was an advisor and counsel to Governor Dan K. Moore and later chaired the executive committee of the North Carolina Democratic Party (1966–1968). He was a delegate to the 1968 Democratic National Convention.

In 1982, Valentine was elected to Congress from North Carolina's 2nd congressional district and served six terms in the House of Representatives. He did not stand for re-election in 1994 and retired from elected office when his term expired in January 1995. A portion of U.S. 64 near Nashville is named for him in recognition of his public service.

== Personal life ==
Valentine was survived by Barbara Reynolds, four children from his first marriage to Betsy, including talk radio host Phil Valentine; three stepchildren; nine grandchildren; five step-grandchildren; and a step-great-grandson.

Valentine died at his home in Nashville on November 10, 2015, from heart failure at the age of 89. His death came one week after the death of a Republican former colleague, Howard Coble of North Carolina's 6th congressional district.

U.S. House of Representatives
Preceded by Lawrence H. Fountain	Member of the U.S. House of Representatives from North Carolina's 2nd congressional district 1983–1995	Succeeded by David Funderburk
