= Sabatino =

Sabatino is both an Italian surname and a masculine Italian given name. Notable people with the name include:

== Surname ==
- Anthony Sabatino (1944–1993), American art director
- Daniela Sabatino (born 1985), Italian footballer
- Dean Sabatino (born 1962), American musician
- Gennaro Sabatino (born 1993), Italian motorcycle racer
- Hugo Sabatino, Argentine-Brazilian physician
- Michael Sabatino (born 1955), American actor
- Nicola Sabatino (1705–1796), Italian composer
- Pasquale Di Sabatino (born 1988), Italian racing driver

== Given name ==
- Sabatino Moscati (1922–1997), Italian archaeologist and linguist
- Sabatino de Ursis (1575–1620), Italian Jesuit and missionary
