= Kristin Bervig Valentine =

American college professor (1933–2024)

- Born: Kristin Bervig; 1933; East Lansing, Michigan, U.S.
- Died: August 26, 2024 (aged 90–91); Tempe, Arizona, U.S.
- Occupations: College professor, playwright

Kristin Bervig Valentine (1933 – August 26, 2024) was an American academic. She was a professor of communications and women's studies at Arizona State University from 1976 to 2003.

== Early life and education ==
Bervig was born in East Lansing, Michigan, the daughter of Harold Bervig. Her mother taught elocution, gave readings and staged plays. She graduated from the University of Wisconsin with a bachelor's degree in speech therapy, earned a master's degree in communication from the University of Washington, and completed her Ph.D. at the University of Utah. Her dissertation was titled "A Patterned Imagination: William Morris's Use of Pattern in Decorative Design and the Last Prose Romances, 1883–1896" (1975).

== Career ==
Valentine taught at Utah State University as a young woman, and at Anatolia College in Greece in the 1960s. She was a professor of communications and women's studies at Arizona State University from 1976 to 2003. She scripted and directed a campus dramatization of Beowulf in 1984, based on the Burton Raffel translation. She received grants from the National Endowment for the Humanities for Angle of Vision, a performance-based project for studies of contemporary literature of the American West. She was a founder of The Empty Space, a performance studio on campus. She was active in the College Program for Incarcerated Women. She gave a talk on "Images and Tales of St. James in Spain" at a church in Phoenix in 1985.

In 2001, Valentine received a Distinguished Service Award from the National Communication Association. The same association gave her the Wallace Bacon Lifetime Teaching Excellence Award in 2002. After she retired in 2003, the Kristin Bervig Valentine Scholarship in Performance Studies funded students interested in performance and storytelling at Arizona State University.

== Publications ==
Valentine's work was published in scholarly journals including Women and Language, Women's Studies in Communication, Mediterranean Studies, Field Methods, Text and Performance Quarterly, and Journal of American Folklore.

- Angle of Vision: Interpreting Contemporary Western Fiction (1986, with Janet L. Jacobsen)
- "Metaphors in the university, or I never promised you an ivory tower" (1994, with Eugene Valentine)
- "'If the Guards Only Knew': Communication Education for Women in Prison" (1998)
- "Performance of Oral Traditions: A Service-Learning Approach" (1999)
- "Theatre in the Streets: Carnaval in Spanish Galicia" (1999, with Eugene Valentine)
- "Storytelling in Spanish Galicia" (1999, with Eugene Valentine)
- "Cultural Performance Analysis Spheres: An Integrated Ethnographic Methodology" (2001, with Gordon Matsumoto)
- "Yaqui Easter Ceremonies and the Ethics of Intense Spectatorship" (2002)
- "Healing at the Coast of Death in Spanish Galicia: The Romería to Our Lady’s Boat" (2005, with Eugene Valentine)
- "Unlocking the doors for incarcerated women through performance and creative writing" (2006)
- Trust (2010, a one-act play, with Gene Valentine)

== Personal life ==
Bervig married fellow professor Don Eugene Valentine in 1967. They had a daughter, Karin. Her husband and daughter both died in 2022. She died in 2024, at the age of 91, in Tempe. Her papers are in the Arizona State University Library.
