= Valentinos =

Valentinos (Greek: Βαλεντίνος) is a Greek male given name, equivalent to the English name Valentine.

People with this given name include:

- Valentinos Sielis (born 1990; Greek: Βαλεντίνος Σιέλης), Cypriot soccer player
- Valentinos Vlachos (born 1992; Greek: Βαλεντίνος Βλάχος), Greek soccer player
