= Valentine House (Macon, Georgia) =

Historic house in Georgia, United States

The Valentine House in Macon, Georgia was a historic building that was listed on the National Register of Historic Places in 1969. It was ordered demolished later.
