= Valentín Umeres =

Argentine professional footballer

Personal information
- Full name: Renzo Valentín Umeres
- Date of birth: 16 June 2003 (age 23)
- Place of birth: Argentina
- Height: 1.67 m (5 ft 6 in)
- Position: Attacking midfielder

Team information
- Current team: Deportivo Merlo

Youth career
- Villa Dálmine

Senior career*
Years	Team	Apps	(Gls)
2020–2022	Villa Dálmine	8	(1)
2021	→ Talleres (loan)	0	(0)
2023	San Martin (M)	6	(0)
2024–	Deportivo Merlo	5	(0)
- * Club domestic league appearances and goals as of 30 March 2024

Renzo Valentín Umeres (born 16 June 2003) is an Argentine professional footballer who plays as an attacking midfielder for Deportivo Merlo.

== Career ==
Umeres started his senior career in Primera B Nacional with Villa Dálmine at the age of seventeen. He was promoted into Felipe De la Riva's first-team squad ahead of the 2020 campaign, with the player subsequently making his professional debut on matchday one away to eventual champions Sarmiento on 28 November 2020; he replaced Tomás Garro with twelve minutes remaining of a goalless draw. His first start arrived on 20 December at home against Atlético de Rafaela, which preceded his first goal coming on 3 January 2021 versus Gimnasia y Esgrima away from home. He finished the season with eight appearances.

On 13 February 2021, Umeres completed a loan move to Primera División side Talleres; on a deal lasting until the end of the year, with La T holding a purchase option. On 2023, Valentín arrives to San Martin (M), playing in Torneo Federal A.

== Career statistics ==
As of 18 February 2021.

Appearances and goals by club, season and competition
Club	Season	League			Cup		League Cup		Continental		Other		Total	
Club	Season	Division	Apps	Goals	Apps	Goals	Apps	Goals	Apps	Goals	Apps	Goals	Apps	Goals
Villa Dálmine	2020	Primera Nacional	8	1	0	0	—		—		0	0	8	1
Villa Dálmine	2021	Primera Nacional	0	0	0	0	—		—		0	0	0	0
Villa Dálmine	Total		8	1	0	0	—		—		0	0	8	1
Talleres (loan)	2021 (Note: Soccerway counts Copa de la Liga Profesional appearances as league appearances.)	Primera División	0	0	0	0	—		0	0	0	0	0	0
Career total			8	1	0	0	—		0	0	0	0	8	1
