= Itimous T. Valentine Sr. =

American judge (1887–1970)

Itimous T. Valentine Sr. (1887 – July 27, 1970) was a justice of the North Carolina Supreme Court from 1951 to 1952.

Born in Nash County, North Carolina, Valentine attended Guilford College in Greensboro. He enlisted in the North Carolina National Guard on December 15, 1917, during World War I, and was deployed with the United States Army to the Headquarters Company of the 113th Field Artillery Regiment in France. Entering as a private first class, he was promoted to corporal during his service, returning to North Carolina after the war, in 1919.

After the war, Valentine studied law at Wake Forest University. He spent twelve years as a prosecuting attorney of the Nash County Recorder's Court, and served as an alderman for the city of Nashville, North Carolina, and on the State Board of Charities and Public Welfare. He served in the U.S. Army again during World War II, achieving the rank of Lieutenant Colonel and being awarded the Bronze Star Medal for meritorius service in the India Burma theater. In 1951, Governor W. Kerr Scott appointed Valentine to a seat on the state supreme court. The following year, Valentine ran for reelection to the seat, but was defeated in the Democratic primary by R. Hunt Parker, who went on to win the general election.

Valentine died in Nashville, North Carolina, at the age of 82, following a lengthy illness. His son, popularly known as Tim Valentine, served in the United States House of Representatives.

Political offices
Preceded by Walter P. Stacy	Justice of the North Carolina Supreme Court; 1951–1952	Succeeded by R. Hunt Parker
