= Valentinus =

Valentinus is a Roman masculine given name derived from the Latin word "valens" meaning "healthy, strong". It may refer to:

== People ==
=== Churchmen ===
- Pope Valentine (died 827)
- Saint Valentine, 3rd century Christian saint
- Valentinus (Gnostic) (died c. 150), early Christian gnostic theologian
- Valentinus Paquay (1828–1905), Friar Minor
- Valentinus Smalcius (1572–1622), German Socinian theologian

=== Emperors and pretenders ===
- Valentinus (rebel), 4th-century Roman exile who attempted a conspiracy in Roman Britain
- Valentinus (usurper) (died 644), Byzantine general and usurper, father of empress Fausta

=== Scholars ===
- Basilius Valentinus, 15th century monk from Erfurt who may have described bismuth
- Valentinus Lublinus (16th-century–16th-century), 16th-century Polish physician and editor
- Valentinus Otho (died 1603), German mathematician and astronomer
- Valentinus Nabodus (1523–1593), German mathematician, astronomer and astrologer

== Biology ==
- Anacyclus valentinus, a species of aster
- Ischnocolus valentinus, a small, old-world tarantula
- Squalius valentinus, a species of freshwater fish in the carp family Cyprinidae

== See also ==
- Valentin, given name
- Valentina (given name), the feminine of Valentinus
- Valentine (disambiguation)
- Valentinian (disambiguation)
- Bálint, the Hungarian version
