= Rezső Bálint (painter) =

Hungarian artist

Rezső Bálint (14 October 1885 – 18 November 1945) was a Hungarian painter known for his landscape paintings.

He had two younger brothers. Albert Berger (originally Béla) (1898–1938) and Jenő Bálint (Berger) (1889(?)–1945). Both of them chose careers close to painting, dealing with art sales, supporting new talents, and painting criticism. From 1898 to 1902, so between the ages of 13 and 17, he studied as a printer at the Franklin company.

At first he was not admitted to the Pattern Drawing School. He and his father visited the famous painters of the time one after the other, Fülöp László almost did not accept them, Bertalan Székely's answer is quoted verbatim by Rezső Bálint: "I do not recommend that he enter the field of painting. I prefer the industrial track. Stick to your craft. For a cobbler rather than a painter!" But he refused to give up, even though he didn't dare to go home after the many failures. He lived with a friend and painted postcards for a living.

He was an avid card player, so much so that once he even gambled away his wife' family fortune.

He studied painting under the guidance of Manó Vesztróczy and Ferenc Szablya-Frischauf. In 1906 he continued his studies of painting in Nagybánya (Baia Mare, Romania) and later in Paris.

Between 1906 and 1908, he was taught by Béla Iványi-Grünwald and Károly Ferenczy in Nagybánya.

In 1909, he changed his name from Rudolf Berger to Rezső Bálint and the same year he had his first exhibition in Budapest in 1909. In 1910 and 1911 he rented a studio jointly with A. Modigliani on Montparnasse in Paris. In 1911 and 1912 he worked with an extensive number of artists at Kecskemét. In the spring of 1915, he opened a painting school in Izbég, with great interest.

In 1919 he published a portfolio entitled Shapes, Patches and Lines presenting ten stone-drawings preceded by an introduction by the Hungarian poet, Dezső Kosztolányi.

After 1920 he lived in Izbég a municipality of Szentendre where he mostly painted landscapes. The Hungarian National Gallery today contains three of his pictures: "Mother with Her Child", "Interieur", "A Hospital Scene".

Once, a Catholic community asked him to paint and decorate the church, but he said no. He stated that he did not paint frescoes and was not a room painter.

He came back to Hungary in 1940, they survived the war and the ghetto. Then in 1945, bad luck ended his life: the gas tap in the Király Street apartment in Budapest was left open and he died of gas poisoning.

== His art ==
The extremely rich oeuvre prompted many writers, poets, and the most famous art critics to deal in depth with Bálint's qualities. Dezső Kosztolányipraised the work of Rezső Bálint several times in his writings, in some cases at the request of the artist. In 1916, Bálint's war pictures were exhibited. A review of this was published in Múlt és Jövő (Past and Future) magazine. Kosztolányi begins his article by recalling an earlier criticism: "About Rezső Bálint - a long time ago, still in peace - when he exhibited his pictures, among other things I wrote the following: In his pictures, harmony flows. Someone could call him a painter of silence". Later he continues:

"The "painter of silence" entered the World War. Let us describe that his artistic creed has not changed even today. These pictures, drawings and pastels all testify to the fact that he is under the inspiration of the eternal "impressionism", which he acquired for himself, at the cost of individual struggles and which is not taken down by any sign or new fashion. We can add that his impressionism has deepened since then. Rezső Bálint was always one of those painters who thought about the nature and purpose of their art, about the importance of the foaming and swirling life around them. The creator of these images indicated the relationship between the world and his individuality with every feature. And because a real artist didn't produce objects of use: he announced a dissenting opinion. Now his lyrics are even more meaningful."

In 1928, Jenő Józsi Tersánszky wrote the following in the 'Nyugat' (West):

"Rezső Bálint, as he presents himself to us in this latest exhibition, is undoubtedly at the peak of his art. His vision is settled, his routine is complete. The search for forms of expression is already behind him. It has been a long and difficult road to get here. However, one thing can be said about this road. He did not fall into excesses or extremes in any of his positions. Roughly speaking, it can be said that in matters of manner of expression, what he learned, or what he observed and passed on to himself, is like the quintessence of different perceptions."

== External links and sources ==
- Fine Arts in Hungary
