= Valentina =

Valentina may refer to:

== People ==
- Valentina (given name), a female given name (includes a list of people with the name)
- Valentina (drag queen) (born 1991), an American drag performer, actor, television personality and singer
- Valentina (fashion designer) (1899–1989), a Ukrainian fashion designer
- Valentina (French singer), French singer Valentina Tronel (born 2009), winner of the 2020 Junior Eurovision Song Contest
- Valentina (Italian singer), stage name of Italian Eurobeat and Italo disco singer Elena Ferretti (born 1960)
- Claudia Valentina, stage name of British singer and songwriter Claudia Annabelle Cooney (born 2000)
- Valentina (wrestler), a ring name of American professional wrestler Elizabeth Miklosi (born 1983)

== Arts and entertainment ==
=== Film ===
- Valentina (1950 film), an Argentine film
- Valentina (2008 film), an Argentine film
- Valentina (2021 film), a Spanish animated film

=== Television ===
- Valentina (1993 TV series), a Mexican telenovela
- Valentina (2013 telenovela), a Chilean telenovela
- Valentina (1989 TV series), an Italian television series

=== Comics ===
- Valentina (Italian comics), an Italian comic book by Guido Crepax
- Valentina (Philippine comics), a supervillainess in the Filipino comic book Darna
- Valentina Allegra de Fontaine, a fictional espionage agent in the Marvel Comics universe

=== Music ===
- Valentina (album), a 2012 album by English band The Wedding Present
- "Valentina", a song about Valentina Tereshkova by Public Service Broadcasting from the 2015 album The Race for Space
- "Valentina", a 2023 song from the album Never Enough by Daniel Caesar

== Other uses ==
- Valentina (hot sauce), a Mexican hot sauce
- Valentina (software), an open source software tool for pattern drafting

== See also ==
- Valentino (disambiguation)
- Valentine (disambiguation)
