= Valerie (given name) =

- Pronunciation: /ˈvæləri/ VAL-ə-ree
- Gender: Female

Origin
- Origin: Latin nomen Valerius
- Meaning: Strong, brave (valiant), "Fierce"
- Region of origin: France, England, Ireland, Scotland, Germany, Scandinavia

Other names
- Related names: Valarie, Valeria, Valery, Val

Valerie is generally a feminine given name, derived directly from the French Valérie (a traditionally female name). Valéry or Valery is a masculine given name in parts of Europe (particularly in France and Russia), as well as a common surname in Francophone countries. Another, much rarer, French masculine form of the name is Valère.

Both feminine and masculine forms of Valerie have derivatives in many European languages and are especially common in Russian and other Eastern European languages. The masculine form is not always a cognate of the feminine; it can have a distinct etymology.

== Etymology ==
=== Romance ===
The name is generally of Romance origins. The Latin clan name, Valerius, is masculine and denotes strength, health or boldness. Valeria is simply the feminine form of this. Both masculine and feminine given names are derived via French into other languages.

In Catholic Europe, given names always related the individual to a saint, so the popularity of a name often reflected the importance of the cult of a saint. There were several important saints who bore the name and were widely venerated in the Middle Ages and, more locally in recent times. St Valerie of Limoges (French Sainte Valérie de Limoges) probably exercised the greatest influence in spreading the name. Her cult was practised along the important Way of St James and, as a cephalophore, she became a favourite subject in the early modern ceramics industry.

The majority of variant spellings have emerged relatively recently, mainly in the 20th century, origin, with fashions often following the forms adopted in popular songs.

=== Germanic ===
The modern masculine given name Valéry is ambiguous. While generally considered a cognate of Valérie, it can also be a development of, or synonym for, the name Walaric(us) (English Walric), which is of Germanic origin and signifies "foreign power". A notable example is Walric, abbot of Leuconay. Both "Saint-Valery" [valri] and "Saint-Valéry" [valeri] are common elements in French place-names, often used optionally for the same place. The second form is a modern misspelling for 'Saint-Valery', that is to say St Walric.

== People with the given name ==
- Valerie Adams (born 1984), New Zealand shot putter
- Valerie Agnew (born 1969), American drummer
- Valérie Aimard (born 1969), French classical cellist
- Valérie Allain (born 1966), French actress
- Valerie Amos, Baroness Amos (born 1954), Guyanese–born English diplomat and politician
- Valerie Anand (1937–2024), English author
- Valérie André (1922–2025), French Resistance member and aviator
- Valerie Ashby (born 1966), American chemist and professor
- Valerie Aurora, American feminist activist and software engineer
- Valerie Azlynn (born 1980), American actress
- Valérie Barizza (born 1967), French short-track speed skater
- Valérie Barlois-Mevel-Leroux (born 1969), French fencer
- Valerie Barsom (born 1960), American attorney and politician
- Valérie Barthelemy (born 1991), Belgian triathlete
- Valérie Batut (born 1969), French tennis player
- Valérie Bazin-Malgras (born 1969), French politician
- Valérie Beauvais (born 1963), French politician
- Valérie Bègue (born 1985), French beauty pageant titleholder
- Valerie Belgrave (1946–2016), Trinidadian artist and author
- Valérie Belin (born 1964), French photographer
- Valérie Bellenoue (born 1975), French sport shooter
- Valerie Belton, British professor
- Valérie Bemeriki (born 1955), Rwandan war criminal
- Valérie Benguigui (1961–2013), French actress
- Valerie Beral (1946–2022), Australian–born English academic and epidemiologist
- Valerie Bergere (1867–1938), French–born American actress
- Valerie Bertinelli (born 1960), American actress and television personality
- Valerie Bettis (1919–1982), American choreographer and dancer
- Valérie Blass (born 1967), Canadian artist
- Valerie Bloom (born 1956), Jamaican–born English novelist and poet
- Valerie Boles (1932–2009), American root doctor
- Valérie Bonneton (born 1970), French actress
- Valérie Bonnier (1950–2020), French actress, novelist, and screenwriter
- Valerie Boothby (1904–1982), German actress, painter, and writer
- Valerie Bowman, author and novelist
- Valerie Boyd (1963–2022), American academic, journalist, and writer
- Valérie Boyer (born 1962), French politician
- Valerie Bradford (born 1953), Canadian politician
- Valerie Brandes, English publisher
- Valerie Brandy (born 1990), American actress and filmmaker
- Valerie Broussard (born 1991), American singer and songwriter
- Valerie K. Brown (born 1954), American politician
- Valerie Browning (born 1950), English–born Australian nurse
- Valerie Bryson, British political scientist
- Valerie Buhagiar (born 1963), Maltese–born Canadian actress, director, and television host
- Valerie Jane Bunce, American political scientist
- Valerie Cagle (born 2002), American softball player
- Valerie Callister (born 1950), Australian politician
- Valerie Camillo, American sports executive
- Valerie Campos (born 1983), Mexican artist
- Valerie Capers (born 1935), American composer and pianist
- Valerie E. Caproni (born 1955), American judge
- Valerie Carr (born 1936), American singer
- Valérie Piller Carrard (born 1978), Swiss politician
- Valerie Carter (1953–2017), American singer and songwriter
- Valerie Chow (born 1970), Hong Kong–Canadian actress, entrepreneur, and publicist
- Valerie Clark, American politician
- Valerie Cohen, American rabbi
- Valerie Coleman, American composer and flutist
- Valerie Compton (born 1963), Canadian journalist and writer
- Valerie Concepcion (born 1970), Filipino actress and television host
- Valerie Constien (born 1996), American track and field athlete
- Valerie Corral (born 1953), American cannabis activist and writer
- Valérie Courtois (born 1990), Belgian volleyball player
- Valerie Cowie (1924–2023), English psychiatrist
- Valérie Crunchant (born 1978), French actress
- Valerie Cruz, Cuban–American actress
- Valerie Curtin (born 1945), American actress and screenwriter
- Valerie Daggett, American biochemist
- Valérie Damidot (born 1965), French television personality
- Valerie Davey (born 1940), English politician
- Valerie Davidson (born 1967), American politician
- Valerie Davies (1912–2001), Welsh swimmer
- Valérie De Bue (born 1966), Belgian politician
- Valerie Delacorte (1914–2011), Hungarian actress
- Valérie Deloge (born 1966), French farmer and politician
- Valerie Demey (born 1994), Belgian racing cyclist
- Valérie Deseine, French film editor
- Valerie Desmore (1925–2008), South African artist and fashion designer
- Valérie Devaux (born 1964), French politician
- Valérie Dionne (born 1980), Canadian water polo player
- Valerie Docherty (born 1963), Canadian politician
- Valerie Domínguez (born 1981), Colombian actress, model, and beauty queen
- Valerie Domleo (1932–2020), English farmer, physicist, and rally co-driver
- Valérie Donzelli (born 1973), French actress and filmmaker
- Valerie Dore (born 1963), Italian singer
- Valérie Ducognon (born 1972), French ski mountaineer
- Valérie Durier (born 1966), French columnist, journalist, and radio and television host
- Valerie Ebe (born 1947), Nigerian lawyer and politician
- Valerie Edmond (born 1969), Scottish actress
- Valerie Espinoza, American politician
- Valérie Fabre (born 1966), French archer
- Valérie Favre (born 1959), Swiss artist
- Valerie Finnis (1924–2006), English gardener, lecturer, photographer, and teacher
- Valerie Fisher (1927–2013), Australian advocate
- Valerie A. Fitzhugh, American pathologist and professor
- Valerie Flint (1936–2009), English historian and scholar
- Valérie Fourneyron (born 1959), French politician
- Valerie Foushee (born 1956), American politician
- Valerie Fraser, American politician
- Valerie French (socialite) (1909–1997), English socialite
- Valérie de Gasparin (1813–1894), Swiss woman of letters
- Valérie Gauvin (born 1996), French soccer player
- Valérie Gay (born 1968), French para table tennis player
- Valerie Ghent (born 1964), American composer, musician, singer, songwriter, audio engineer, and record producer
- Valerie Gibson, English physicist and professor
- Valérie Gillioz (born 1987), Swiss association football player
- Valérie Glatigny (born 1973), Belgian politician
- Valerie Glover, Australian artist
- Valerie Glozman (born 2006), American tennis player
- Valérie Gomez-Bassac (born 1969), French politician
- Valerie Goulding (1918–2003), English–Irish campaigner
- Valérie Grand'Maison (born 1988), Canadian Paralympic swimmer
- Valerie Greaves (1945–2015), English jockey
- Valérie Grenier (born 1996), Canadian Alpine skier
- Valerie Grove (born 1946), English author and journalist
- Valérie Grumelin-Halimi (born 1961), French therapist, psychoanalyst, and writer
- Valérie Guignabodet (1965–2016), French film director
- Valérie Guiyoule (born 1972), French triple jumper
- Valerie Hall (1946–2016), Irish paleontologist and professor
- Valerie Hamaty (born 1999), Israeli actress, singer, and songwriter
- Valérie Hanicque (born 1964), French athlete
- Valerie Hansen, American author, historian, and professor
- Valerie G. Hardcastle, American professor and political scientist
- Valerie Harper (1939–2019), American actress
- Valerie Hart (1934–2021), Guyanese politician
- Valérie Harvey (born 1979), Canadian sociologist and writer
- Anne Valérie Hash (born 1971), French fashion designer
- Valérie Hayer (born 1986), French jurist and politician
- Valerie Hegarty (born 1967), American painter, sculptor, and installation artist
- Valerie Henderson (born 1986), American soccer player
- Valérie Hénin (born 1967), French boxer
- Valerie Henitiuk, Canadian scholar
- Valerie Hepworth, British charitable trustee
- Valérie Hermann, French businessperson
- Valerie Hernández (born 1993), Puerto Rican model and beauty queen
- Valerie Higgins (born 1998), American basketball player
- Valerie Hobson (1917–1988), Irish–born English actress
- Valerie Hoffman, American film and television producer
- Valerie Hollister (born 1939), American artist
- Valerie Holmes (born 1946), English model and beauty queen
- Valerie Horsley, American cell and developmental biologist
- Valerie Hu, American biochemist, professor, and molecular biologist
- Valerie Huber (born 1996), Austrian model and beauty queen
- Valerie M. Hudson (born 1958), American professor and political scientist
- Valerie V. Hunt (1916–2014), American author, professor, and scientist
- Valerie Hunter Gordon (1921–2016), English inventor
- Valerie Huttle (born 1956), American politician
- Valérie Igounet, French historian and political scientist
- Valerie Isham (born 1947), English mathematician and professor
- Valérie Issarny (1964–2022), French computer scientist
- Valerie Jackson (born 1949), American philanthropist, advertising executive, and radio host
- Valerie Jarrett (born 1956), American businesswoman and lawyer
- Valerie Jaudon (born 1945), American painter
- Valerie Jenness (born 1963), American author, professor, and researcher, and public policy advisor
- Valerie Jerome (born 1944), Canadian activist, educator, and sprinter
- Valerie June (born 1982), American singer and songwriter
- Valérie Kaboré (born 1965), Ivorian–born Burkinabé filmmaker and politician
- Valérie Kaprisky (born 1962), French actress
- Valérie Karsenti (born 1968), French actress
- Valerie Khoo, Australian journalist, writer, and visual artist
- Valerie Kinloch (born 1974), American educator, writer, and academic administrator
- Valerie Kleiser (born 1993), Austrian bobsledder
- Valérie Kolakis (born 1966), Canadian sculptor and installation artist
- Valerie Koortzen (born 1937), South African tennis player
- Valerie Korinek (born 1965), Canadian historian and professor
- Valerie J. Kuck, American chemist
- Valérie Lacroute (born 1965), French politician
- Valérie Lang (1966–2013), French actress
- Valerie Lawrence (born 1936), Australian shot putter
- Valérie Leclerc (born 1961), French sprint canoeist
- Valerie Leon (born 1943), English actress and model
- Valérie Létourneau (born 1983), Canadian mixed martial artist
- Valerie Lilley (born 1939), Northern Irish actress
- Valerie Mahaffey (1953–2025), American actress
- Valerie McDonnell (born 2004), American politician
- Valerie Morales (born 1976), Puerto Rican actress and singer
- Valérie Nadaud (born 1968), French race walker
- Valerie Otero, American physicist and professor
- Valerie Pearlman (1936–2025), British judge
- Valérie Pécresse (born 1967), French politician
- Valerie Perrine (1943–2026), American actress
- Valerie Pitt (1925–1999), British academic and Church of England campaigner
- Valerie Plame (born 1963), American novelist and spy
- Valérie Plante (born 1974), Canadian politician
- Valérie Quennessen (1957–1989), French actress
- Valerie F. Reyna (born 1955), American psychologist and professor
- Valerie Sayers (born 1952), American author
- Valerie Singleton (born 1937), English radio and television presenter
- Valerie Solanas (1936–1988), American feminist activist
- Valerie E. Stone (born 1958), American physician and professor
- Valerie Sweeting (born 1987), Canadian curler
- Valerie Vaz (born 1954), Yemeni–born English politician
- Valerie Velazquez (born 1985), American entrepreneur, philanthropist, singer, and beauty queen
- Valérie Vogt (born 1962), French actress
- Valerie Vonpechy (born 1947), American composer, educator, and harpist
- Valerie Weiss, American filmmaker and producer
- Valerie Whipps, Palauan politician
- Valerie Rawlston Wilson, American economist
- Valerie Young (born 1937), New Zealand discus thrower and shot putter
- Valerie Yule (1929–2021), Australian academic, researcher, teacher, and child psychologist
- Valerie Zachary (born 1962), American attorney
- Valérie Zenatti (born 1970), French novelist, screenwriter, and translator
- Valerie Ziegenfuss (born 1949), American tennis player
- Valerie Zimring (born 1965), American rhythmic gymnast

As middle name

- Gladys Valerie (1890–1972), American actress, born Gladys Valerie Hays

As stage name

- Joan Valerie (1911–1983), American actress

== Fictional characters ==
- Valerie, a character in the animated series Frisky Dingo
- Valerie Barlow, a character in the British soap opera Coronation Street
- Valerie Gray, a ghost hunter in the cartoon series Danny Phantom
- Valerie Malone, a character in TV series Beverly Hills 90210
- Valerie "Val" Tyler, a character in the TV series What I Like About You

== See also ==
- Valerie (disambiguation)
- Valarie (name)
- Valene
- Valer (disambiguation)
- Valera (disambiguation)
- Valeria (given name)
- Valerian (name)
- Valeriano (name)
- Valerianus (disambiguation)
- Valérien (disambiguation)
- Valeriu (given name)
- Valerius (name)
- Valery (name)
