= Valerian (name) =

- Gender: Male

Origin
- Origin: Latin nomen Valerius
- Region of origin: Italy

Other names
- Related names: Valerie

Valerian is a given name and surname.

== Ancient world ==
- Valerian (emperor) (200 – c. 260), Roman emperor (253-260)
- Valerian II (died 257), Roman Caesar, grandson of the Emperor Valerian
- Saints Tiburtius, Valerian and Maximus
- Valerian of Abbenza (377–457), bishop of Abbenza

== Modern world ==
- Valerian Abakovsky (1895–1921), Russian engineer, inventor of the Aerowagon
- Valerian Albanov (1881–1919), Russian navigator
- Valerian Bestayev (born 1982), Russian footballer
- Valerian Borisovich Aptekar (1889–1937), Russian linguist and propagandist
- Valerian Engelhardt (1798–1856), Russian lieutenant general
- Valerian Freyberg, 3rd Baron Freyberg (born 1970), British peer, sitting as a crossbencher
- Valerian A. Frolov (1895–1961), Soviet Russian military figure
- Valerian Borowczyk (1923–2006), Polish film director
- Valerian Gaprindashvili (1888–1941), Georgian Symbolist poet and translator
- Valerian Gârlă (born 1986), Romanian football player
- Valerian Gracias (1900–1978), Indian Roman Catholic cardinal
- Valerian Gribayedoff (1858–1908), Russian-American journalist
- Valerian Gunia (1862–1938), Georgian dramatist, actor, director, critic, and translator
- Valerian Gvilia (born 1994), Georgian football midfielder
- Valerian Kalinka (1826–1886), Polish priest and historian
- Valerian Klenevski, Azerbaijani politician, Minister of Social Security
- Valerian Kobakhia (1929–1992), Abkhaz Soviet statesman and party leader
- Valerian Krasinski (1795–1855), Polish Calvinist politician, nationalist and historian
- Valerian Kuybyshev (1888–1935), a Russian revolutionary, Red Army officer and prominent Soviet politician
- Valerian Madatov (1782–1829), Russian prince and Lieutenant General
- Valerian Maykov (1823–1847), Russian writer and literary critic
- Valerian Netedu (born 1953), Romanian ice hockey goaltender
- Valerian Onițiu (1872–1948), Romanian chess problemist
- Valerian Osinsky (1887–1938), Russian revolutionary Marxist
- Valerian Pereverzev (1882–1968), Soviet literary scholar
- Valerian Pidmohylny (1901–1939), Ukrainian realist novelist
- Valerian Pletnev (1886–1947), Russian revolutionary, playwright and activist
- Valerian Polyansky (1881–1948), Bolshevik revolutionary and later state functionary
- Valerian Protasewicz (1505–1579), bishop of Lutsk and Vilnius, founder of the Jesuit college
- Valerian Revenco (1939–2016), Moldovan politician, Minister of Labor, Family and Social Protection
- Valerian Rodrigues (born 1949), Indian political scientist
- Valerian Ruminski (born 1967), American singer
- Valerian Rybar (1919–1990), American interior designer
- Valerian Safonovich (1798–1867), Russian ruler of Oryol Governorate
- Valérian Sauveplane (born 1980), French sport shooter
- Valerian Savelyev (born 1962), Russian football player and coach
- Valerian Shalikashvili (1874–1919), Georgian producer, actor, and playwright
- Valerian Sidamon-Eristavi (1889-1983), Georgian Modernist artist and set designer
- Valerian Sokolov (born 1946), Soviet boxer
- Valerian Șesan (1878–1940), Romanian theologian
- Valerián Švec (born 1995), Slovak football player and coach
- Valerian Stan (born 1955), Romanian dignitary, lawyer and military officer, civic and human rights activist
- Valerian Tevzadze (1894–1987), Georgian military officer
- Valerian Trifa (1914–1987), Romanian Orthodox cleric and fascist political activist
- Valerian Ume-Ezeoke (born 1993), American football player
- Valerian Wellesley, 8th Duke of Wellington (1915–2014), styled Marquess of Douro, member of the House of Lords
- Valerian Zirakadze (born 1978), Georgian footballer
- Valerian Zorin (1902–1986), Soviet diplomat
- Valerian Zubov (1771–1804), Russian general who led the Persian Expedition of 1796
- Lars Valerian Ahlfors (1907–1996), Finnish mathematician

== Surname ==
- Bice Valerian (1886–1969), Italian film actress of the silent era
- I. Valerian (1895–1980), Romanian writer
- Jan Valerián Jirsík (1798–1883), Roman Catholic Bishop of Budweis
- Gerald Valerian Wellesley (1770–1848), Church of Ireland cleric
- Gerald Valerian Wellesley (1809–1882), Church of England cleric who became the Dean of Windsor
- Gerald Valerian Wellesley (1885-1961)
- George Edward Valerian Wellesley (born 2007)
- Julian Valerian Wellesley (1933-1966)

== See also ==
- Valery (name)
- Valerie (given name)
- Valeriu (given name)
- Valerius (name)
- Valeria (given name)
- Valerian (disambiguation)
- Valeriano (name)
- Valerianus (disambiguation)
- Valer (disambiguation)
- Valera (disambiguation)
- Valérien (disambiguation)
- Walerian
- Valerian Runkovsky, town in Transnistria, Moldova
- Valeriano Lunense, a place near Five Lands, Italy
