= Valerius (name) =

- Gender: Male

Origin
- Origin: Latin nomen Volesus
- Region of origin: Italy

Other names
- Related names: Valeria, Valerianus, Valerus (Latin), Ο Βαλέριος (Greek) Valerios (Greek), Valer, Valeriu (Romanian), Valérien, Valere (French), Valērijs (Latvian), Valeriano (Spanish/Italian), Valeriev (Bulgarian), Valeri, Valery, Valeriy, Valeriya (Slavic), Walery, Walerian, Waleriany, Walerianowo (Polish), Valerian (Latin/Russian), Valerio, Valerie, Val, Valerii, Valerij, Valero, Vallerie, Vallery Valentinus, Val

Valerius or Valeria was a patrician family at Rome.

Valerius may also refer to:

== Given name ==
- Valerius Maximus, a 1st-century Latin writer: author of a collection of historical anecdotes
- Valerius of Saragossa, bishop of Zaragoza in 290-315
- Valerius of Trèves, a 4th-century bishop of Trier
- Valerius (consul 432), a politician of the Eastern Roman Empire
- Valerius (archbishop of Uppsala), Swedish Archbishop 1207–1219

== Surname ==
- Adriaen Valerius, Dutch poet and composer
- Bertha Valerius, Swedish photographer

== Other ==
- Valerius (novel), an 1821 novel by John Gibson Lockhart

== See also ==
- Valentine (name)
- Valera (disambiguation)
- Vålerenga (disambiguation)
