= Valeriu =

- Gender: Male

Origin
- Origin: Latin nomen Valerius
- Region of origin: Italy

Valeriu is a Romanian-language masculine given name, and may refer to:

- Valeriu Alaci (1884–1955), Romanian mathematician.
- Valeriu Cosarciuc (born 1955), Moldovan politician
- Valeriu Cotea (1926–2016), Romanian oenologist
- Valeriu Traian Frențiu (1875–1952), Romanian Greek Catholic bishop
- Valeriu Gafencu (1921–1952), Romanian Orthodox theologian and Legionnaire
- Valeriu Gaiu (born 2001), Moldovan professional footballer
- Valeriu Ghilețchi (born 1960), Moldovan politician
- Valeriu Graur (1940–2012), political prisoner of the former Soviet Union
- Valeriu Lazăr (born 1968), Moldovan politician
- Valeriu Lazarov (1935–2009), Romanian-born television producer and director
- Valeriu Marcu (1899–1942), Romanian poet, writer and historian
- Valeriu Matei (born 1959), Romanian writer and politician
- Valeriu Moldovan (1875–1954), romanian lawyer
- Valeriu Munteanu (philologist) (1921–1999), Romanian philologist, lexicographer and translator
- Valeriu Munteanu (politician) (born 1980), Moldovan politician
- Valeriu Rudic (born 1947), Moldovan microbiologist
- Valeriu Stoica (born 1953), Romanian politician
- Valeriu Streleț (born 1970), Romanian politician
- Valeriu Tabără (1949–2025), Romanian agronomist and politician
- Valeriu Turcan (born 1976), Romanian journalist

== See also ==
- Valerius (name)
- Valery (name)
- Valerie (given name)
- Valeria (given name)
- Valerian (name)
- Valeriano (name)
- Valerianus (disambiguation)
- Valer (disambiguation)
- Valera (disambiguation)
- Valérien (disambiguation)
