= Val (given name) =

- Gender: Gender-neutral

Origin
- Origin: Latin nomen Valentinus or Valerius, Old Norse Valdr or Vald
- Region of origin: Italy, Sweden

Val is a variant of the feminine names Valerie, Valeria, Valmai, Valentina, or Valene; as well as the masculine names Valeri, Valentine, Valen, Valentino, or Valens.

Val is also a variant of the Old Norse names Vald and Valdr.

== Notable people ==
- Val Ackerman (born 1959), American attorney, former basketball player, and first president of the Women's National Basketball Association
- Val Bennett (died 1991), Jamaican tenor saxophonist and jazz and roots reggae musician
- Val Bettin (1923–2021), American actor
- Val Bjornson (1906–1987), American politician
- Val A. Browning (1895–1994), American industrialist, philanthropist, and third generation gun innovator
- Val Deakin, New Zealand ballet dancer, choreographer and teacher
- Val Demings (born 1957), American politician (US representative from Florida)
- Val Doonican (1927–2015), Irish singer
- Val Fitch (1923–2015), Physicist, Nobel Prize Winner
- Val Gielgud (1900–1981), English actor, writer, director and broadcaster
- Val Guest (1911–2006), British film director
- Val Harris (1884–1963), Irish football and Gaelic football player
- Val Imm (1893–1981), American politician and newspaper editor from Minnesota
- Val Kilmer (1959–2025), American actor
- Val Lehman (born 1943) Australian actress
- Val Lewton (1904–1951), American film director
- Val Mayerik (born 1950), American comic-book and commercial artist, co-creator of Marvel Comics' character Howard the Duck
- Val McDermid (born 1955), Scottish crime novelist
- Val Peterson (1903–1983), American politician and 26th Governor of Nebraska
- Val Valentino (born 1956), American magician, illusionist, and actor
- Val Venis, ring name of Canadian professional wrestler, Sean Morley
- Val (sculptor), born Valérie Goutard

=== Fictional characters ===
- Val Armorr, a comic book martial artist known as Karate Kid
- Val Pollard, in the ITV soap opera Emmerdale
- Val Toriello, in the television situation comedy The Nanny
- Val Cooper, in the Marvel Comics universe
- Valene Ewing, in the American television series Dallas
- Val Resnick, in the 1999 movie Payback
- Valentina Allegra de Fontaine, an espionage agent in the Marvel Comics universe
- Darryl's love interest on the U.S. TV series The Office
- The title character in the comic strip Prince Valiant
- A fictional race in Arcanis, a campaign setting for the Dungeons & Dragons game
- A character in the A Song of Ice and Fire series, the sister of the wife of Mance Rayder
- Val Bilzerian, in the adult animated sitcom Big Mouth
- Val Thundershock, a character from Trolls: TrollsTopia
- Val Little, a character from Monsters at Work
- Val Ortiz, a character from Inside Out 2

== See also ==
- Val (disambiguation)
- Vali (disambiguation)
- Valerie (given name)
- Valery
- Valeria (given name)
