= Våler =

- Gender: Male

Origin
- Origin: Latin nomen Valerius
- Region of origin: Italy

Vaaler or Våler or Valer may refer to:

== Places ==
- Våler Municipality (Østfold), a municipality in Østfold county, Norway
- Våler Municipality (Innlandet), a municipality in Innlandet county, Norway
  - Våler (village), a village and the administrative center of Våler Municipality
- Åsnes og Våler Municipality, a former municipality in Hedmark county (1849–1854), Norway
- Vålerbanen, a motor racing circuit in Braskereidfoss, Norway

== People ==
=== Given name ===
- Valer Austin, permaculturalist involved with desert greening
- Valer Donea, pen name used by Profira Sadoveanu (1906–2003)
- Valer Dorneanu (born 1944), Romanian politician
- Valer Săsărman (1969–2021), Romanian professional footballer
- Valer Toma (born 1957), Romanian rower

=== Surname ===
- Johan Vaaler (1866–1910), Norwegian inventor

== See also ==
- Valeri (name)
- Valeria (given name)
- Valerian (name)
- Valeriano (name)
- Valerie (given name)
- Valērijs (given name)
- Valerij (given name)
- Valery (name)
- Valeriu (given name)
- Valerius (name)
- Valera (disambiguation)
- Valeria (disambiguation)
- Valerianus (disambiguation)
- Valerie (disambiguation)
- Valérien (disambiguation)
- Vale (disambiguation)
