= Valeria (given name) =

- Gender: Female

Origin
- Origin: Latin nomen Valerius
- Region of origin: Italy

Valeria (or Valéria, also spelled Valeriya or Valeriia) is a female given name dating back to the Latin verb valere, meaning strong, brave and healthy "to be strong".

== List of people with the given name Valeria ==
=== Religion ===
- Valeria of Milan, or Saint Valeria, Christian martyr (1st or 2nd century)
- Valeria, a Christian saint martyred with Anesius

=== Roman history ===
- Valeria (wife of Sulla), the fourth wife of Roman dictator Lucius Cornelius Sulla
- Valeria Maximilla, Roman empress as the wife of Emperor Maxentius
- Valeria Messalina, Roman empress as the third wife of Emperor Claudius

=== Arts and entertainment ===
- Valeriya, Russian pop star and The model
- Valeria Bertuccelli, Argentine film and television actress
- Valeria Cavalli, Italian actress
- Valeria Ciangottini, Italian actress
- Valeria Diaz, Argentine actress and singer
- Valeria Gastaldi, Argentine singer
- Valeria Golino, Italian-Greek film and television actress
- Valeria Kozlova, Russian musician also known as Lera Kozlova
- Valeria Marini, Italian model, actress, showgirl and fashion designer
- Valeria Mazza, Argentine supermodel and businesswoman
- Valeria Morales, Puerto Rican singer and actress
- Valeria Moriconi, Italian actress
- Valeria Solarino, Italian actress
- Valeria Bruni Tedeschi, Italian-French actress
- Valeria Lukyanova, Ukrainian model, best known as Human Barbie
- Valeriya Khodos, Ukrainian actress, director, and screenwriter

=== Business ===
- Valeria Lipczynski (1846–1930), American businesswoman

=== Military, space, and government ===
- Valeria Alessandrini (born 1975), Italian politician
- Valeria Fedeli (1949–2026), Italian politician
- Valeriya Gnarovskaya, Soviet military hero
- Valerija Raulinaitis, Lithuanian-American psychiatrist, hospital administrator
- Valerija Skrinjar Tvrz (1928–2023), Slovene Partisan codebreaker, journalist, writer and translator
- Valeria Valente (born 1976), Italian politician and lawyer

=== Sports ===
- Valeria Aleshicheva (born 1990), Ukrainian football midfielder
- Valeriia Baranik (born 1993), Russian handball player
- Valeria Bhunu (born 1995), Zimbabwean tennis player
- Valeriya Gansvind (born 1965), Estonian chess player
- Valeriia Kirdiasheva (born 2000), Russian handball player
- Valeria Kleiner, German football player
- Valeria Lyulyaeva, Russian rower
- Valeria Schiavi, Italian rhythmic gymnast
- Valeria Solovieva, professional Russian tennis player
- Valeria Spälty, Swiss curler
- Valeria Starygina, Russian ice dancer
- Valeria Valasevits, Estonian rhythmic gymnast
- Valeria Zenkova, Russian ice dancer

=== Fictional characters ===
- Valeria, a character in Coriolanus by William Shakespeare
- Valeria (Conan the Barbarian), character in the stories and films concerning Conan the Barbarian
- Valeria Richards (previously Von Doom), a character in Marvel Comics
- Valeria Watt, a character in Carry On Screaming! played by Fenella Fielding
- Valeria, a deserting soldier in the first Suikoden game
- Valeria: a character in the Mexican telenovela El Cuerpo del Deseo
- Valeria: a detective in the novel The Law and the Lady
- Valeria Ferrer, a character in the telenovela Carrusel
- Valeria Ferriz, a character in Elísabet Benavent's book series Valeria
- Valeria Luna, the name used in Spanish-language versions of Yokai Watch to refer to Hailey Anne Thomas (Inaho Misora in Japanese versions)
- Valeria, a character released during Chapter 5 Season 1 of Fortnite

== See also ==
- Valeria (disambiguation)
- Valerie (given name)
- Valery (name)
- Valeriu (given name)
- Valerius (name)
- Valerian (name)
- Valeriano (name)
- Valerianus (disambiguation)
- Valer (disambiguation)
- Valera (disambiguation)
- Valérien (disambiguation)
