= Valerian =

Valerian may refer to:

== Arts and entertainment ==
- A fictional character in Valérian and Laureline, a comics series
  - Valerian and the City of a Thousand Planets, a film adaptation of the comic series
- An early pseudonym for Gary Numan (b. 1958), a musician
- A fictional race in "Dramatis Personae" (Star Trek: Deep Space Nine)
- An arms manufacturer in On the Frontier, a play published in 1938

== People ==
- Valerian (name), including a list of people with the given name and surname
- Valerian (emperor), Roman emperor from 253 to 260

== Plants ==
- Valerian (herb), Valeriana officinalis, a medicinal plant, and the namesake for other valerians.
  - other plants in the genus Valeriana
- Centranthus, a genus containing plants closely related to Valeriana

== Ships ==
- HMS Valerian (1916)

== See also ==
- Valeria (disambiguation)
- Valerianus (disambiguation)
- Valérien (disambiguation)
- Valyrian languages, in the fiction of George R. R. Martin
- Sweet Valerian, a series of manga and anime episodes
