= Valeria =

Valeria may refer to:

== People ==
- Valeria (given name), a female given name
- The gens Valeria, a family at Rome
- Valeria (ancient Roman women), a name used in ancient Rome for women of the gens Valeria
- Saint Valeria (disambiguation), several saints
- Valeriya (born 1968), Russian pop star
- Valeria (footballer, born 1968), Valeria Aparecida Bonifacio, Brazilian football midfielder
- Valéria (footballer, born 1998), Valéria Cantuário da Silva, Brazilian football forward

== Places ==
- Valeria, a late Roman province in Suburbicaria
- Pannonia Valeria, a late Roman province in Pannonia
- Valeria, Iowa, United States
- Valeria, Spain (Roman City), an important Roman city and one of the three major cities (with Segobriga and Ercavica) in the modern province of Cuenca
- Valeria (fictional planet), a planet in the Lensman universe
- Valeria, the name of Fay D. Flourite's native world in Tsubasa: Reservoir Chronicle
- 611 Valeria, a 57-km (35-mile) wide asteroid

== Other uses ==
- Valeria (Conan the Barbarian), a prominent character in the tales of Conan
- Valeria (Takemitsu), a 1965 chamber music composition by Tōru Takemitsu
- Valeria (1966 TV series), a Mexican telenovela
- Valeria (2009 TV series), a Venezuelan-American telenovela
- Valeria (2020 TV series), a Spanish streaming television series
- Valeria (moth), a genus of moths
- Legio vigesima Valeria Victrix, a Roman legion, probably raised by Augustus some time after 31 BC
- Valeria, a 2023 studio album by the Finnish pop-rock artist Arppa

== See also ==
- Valer (disambiguation)
- Valera (disambiguation)
- Valerie (disambiguation)
- Valérien (disambiguation)
