= Valeriano =

- Gender: Male

Origin
- Origin: Latin nomen Valerianus
- Region of origin: Italy

Valeriano may refer to the following people

Given name

- Valeriano Abello (1913–2000), Filipino scout during World War II
- Valeriano Bécquer (1833–1870), Spanish painter and graphic artist
- Valeriano López (1926–1993), Peruvian football forward
- Valeriano Nchama (born 1995), Equatoguinean football midfielder
- Valeriano Orobón Fernández (1901–1936), Spanish anarcho-syndicalist theoretician, trade-union activist, translator and poet
- Valeriano Pellegrini (c. 1663–1746), Italian soprano singer
- Valeriano Pérez (born 1941), Mexican fencer
- Valeriano Rebello (born 1983), Indian football player
- Valeriano Weyler (1838–1930), Spanish general and colonial administrator

Surname

- Antonio Valeriano (ca. 1531–1605), Mexican scholar and politician
- Antonio Valeriano (the younger), Mexican politician, grandson of Antonio
- Giuseppe Valeriano (1542–1596), Italian painter and architect
- Pierio Valeriano Bolzani (1477–1558), Italian Renaissance humanist
- Salvador Valeriano Pineda (born 1965), Honduran politician
- Víctor Felipe Calderón Valeriano, Peruvian dancer

== See also ==
- Valeriano Lunense, a village in Italy
- Valery (name)
- Valerie (given name)
- Valeriu (given name)
- Valerius (name)
- Valeria (given name)
- Valerian (name)
- Valerianus (disambiguation)
- Valer (disambiguation)
- Valera (disambiguation)
- Valérien (disambiguation)
