= Valerie =

Valerie may refer to:

== People ==
- Saint Valerie (disambiguation)
- Valerie (given name), feminine

== Songs ==
- "Valerie" (Steve Winwood song), 1982
- "Valerie" (Zutons song), 2006, also prominently covered by Mark Ronson and Amy Winehouse
- "Valerie", 1981, by Quarterflash, from Quarterflash
- "Valerie", 1982, by Jerry Garcia from Run for the Roses
- "Valerie", 1986, by Bad Company from Fame and Fortune
- "Valerie", 1986, by Joy from Hello
- "Valerie", 1986, by Richard Thompson
- "Valerie", 1993, by Patti Scialfa from Rumble Doll
- "Valerie", 2002, by Reel Big Fish from Cheer Up!
- "Valerie", 2011, by the Weeknd from Thursday
- "Valerie", 2020, by Bladee from 333
- "Valerie", 2020, by TV Girl from The Night in Question: French Exit Outtakes
- "La Valérie", 2004, by Malajube from Le compte complet

== Other ==
- Valerie (dog), an Australian formerly missing dog
- Valerie (collective), a group of French musicians founded by David Grellier
- Valerie (TV series), later known as The Hogan Family
- Valerie (film), a 1957 feature film
- Valérie (film), a 1969 Canadian film
- Valerie Brown, a character in Josie and the Pussycats
- Valerie (aka V), the female protagonist in Cyberpunk 2077

== See also ==
- "Valleri", a 1968 song written by Boyce and Hart for the Monkees
- Valery
- Valer (disambiguation)
- Valera (disambiguation)
- Valeria (disambiguation)
- Valérien (disambiguation)
