= Valeria (ancient Roman women) =

See also Valeria (given name).

Valeria was a name used in ancient Rome for women of the gens Valeria. Notable figures include:

- Valeria, the sister of P. Valerius Publicola, who is said to have advised the Roman matrons to ask Veturia, the mother of Coriolanus, to go to the camp of Coriolanus in order to deprecate his resentment.
- Valeria Messala, the fifth wife of Lucius Cornelius Sulla.
- Valeria Messalina, died 48, third wife of the Emperor Claudius.
- Valeria Maximilla, Empress of Rome and wife of Emperor Maxentius

== See also ==
- List of Wikipedia articles beginning with "Valeria"
