= Walerian =

- Gender: Male

Origin
- Origin: Latin nomen Valerius
- Region of origin: Italy

Walerian is both a given name and a surname. Notable people with this given name include:

- Walerian Borowczyk (1923–2006), Polish film director
- Walerian Czuma (1890–1962), Polish general and military commander
- Walerian Kalinka (1826–1886), Polish priest and historian
- Walerian Łukasiński (1787–1868), Polish officer and political activist
- Walerian Kisieliński (1907–1988), Polish soccer forward
- Walerian Krasiński (1795–1855), Polish Calvinist politician, nationalist and historian
- Walerian Maryański (1875–1946), Polish sports shooter
- Walerian Pańko (1941–1991), Polish lawyer, and professor of legal science
- Walerian Tewzadze (1894–1987), Georgian military officer
- Jerzy Walerian Braun (1911–1968), Polish rower
- Leon Walerian Ostroróg (1867–1932), Islamic scholar, jurist, adviser to the Ottoman government

Notable people with this surname include

- Mat Walerian, jazz saxophonist and woodwind player

== See also ==
- Valeri
- Valerian (name)
