= Valere =

Valere or Valère may refer to:

== People ==
- Valère Amoussou (born 1987), Beninese football player
- Valère Billen (born 1952), Belgian football coach
- Valère Germain (born 1990), French football player
- Valère Gille (born 1867), Belgian poet
- Valère Guillet (1796–1881), notary and political figure in colonial Quebec
- Valère de Langres or Saint Valère (died 411), archdeacon of Langres
- Valère Ollivier (1921–1958), Belgian racing cyclist
- Valère Regnault (1545–1623), French Jesuit theologian
- Alfred-Valère Roy (1870–1942), Canadian politician
- Valère Somé (1950–2017), politician and scholar from Burkina Faso
- Valere Van Sweevelt (born 1947), Belgian former racing cyclist
- Valère Thiébaud (born 1999), Swiss racing cyclist
- Simone Valère (1923–2010), French actress
- Valérie Valère (1961–1981), French writer
- Gabriel Valère Eteka Yemet, Congolese politician, First Secretary of the National Assembly 2012–7

== Places and structures ==
- Valère Basilica, fortified church in Sion, Valais, Switzerland
- Valere, Torbeck, Haiti, village in the Les Cayes Arrondissement, in the Sud department of Haiti
- Saint-Valère, Quebec, municipality located in the Centre-du-Québec region of Quebec, Canada

== Other ==
- Valere Power (Eltek), global electric power conversion specialist

== See also ==
- Horn of Valere, artefact in The Wheel of Time series of fantasy novels by American author James Oliver Rigney Jr., under his pen name of Robert Jordan
- Groslot de Valere, a red French wine grape variety that is grown primarily in the Loire Valley of France
- Valerie (disambiguation)
- Valeriev
- Valernes
- Vallière
- Vallières (disambiguation)
- Vallères
