= Valery =

Origin
- Origin: Latin nomen Valerius

Other names
- Alternative spelling: Valéry, Valerio, Valero

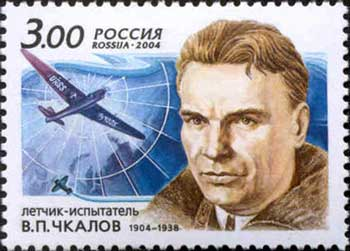
Stamps of Russia, 100th birth anniversary of test pilot Valery Chkalov (1904–1938), issued in 2004

Valery (French: [valeri]) is a male given name and occasional surname. It is derived from the Latin name Valerius. The Slavic given name Valeriy or Valeri is prevalent in Russia and derives directly from the Latin. The Italian and Catalan meanings of the surname Valeri derived from Valerio or Valero.

== Given name ==
- Valery Afanassiev, Russian pianist and author
- Valery V. Afanasyev, Russian hockey coach
- Valery Asratyan (1958–1996), Soviet serial killer
- Valery Belenky, Azerbaijani-German former Olympic artistic gymnast
- Valeriy Belousov, Russian decathlete
- Valeri Bojinov, Bulgarian international footballer
- Valery Bryusov, Russian poet
- Valeri Bukrejev, Estonian pole vaulter
- Valeri Bure, Russian ice hockey player
- Valery Chekalov (1976–2023), Russian mercenary leader
- Valery Chkalov, Russian aircraft test pilot
- Valery Gazzaev, Russian football manager
- Valery Gerasimov, Russian General, the current Chief of the General Staff of the Armed Forces of Russia, and first Deputy Defence Minister. He was appointed by President Vladimir Putin on 9 November 2012. Strategist who conceived the "Gerasimov doctrine" which is currently prevalent in Russian military strategy.
- Valery Gergiev, Ossetian-Russian conductor
- Valéry Giscard d'Estaing, president of the French Republic
- Valery Goryukhanov (born 1990), Russian politician
- Valeriy Gridnev, Russian painter
- Valery Jacobi, Russian painter
- Valery Karasyov, former Olympic artistic gymnast
- Valeri Karpin, Russian football player
- Valeri Kharlamov, Russian former Olympic hockey player
- Valery Kerdemelidi, former Olympic artistic gymnast
- Valery Khodemchuk (1951–1986), Soviet engineer and first victim of the Chernobyl Disaster
- Valery Kipelov, Russian heavy metal singer and composer (former member of Aria (band) and current leader of Kipelov bands)
- Valeri Kois, Estonian politician
- Valery Larbaud, French author
- Valeriy Lebed, Ukrainian professional footballer
- Valery Legasov, Russian scientist. He was the chief of the investigation committee of the Chernobyl disaster.
- Valery Leontiev, Russian pop singer
- Valery Likhodey, Russian basketball player
- Valeri Liukin, Kazakh-American former Olympic artistic gymnast and current gymnastics coach. Father of Nastia Liukin
- Valeriy Lobanovskyi, Ukrainian football manager
- Valery Meladze, Russian pop singer
- Valery Mezhlauk, Latvian-German and former chairman of GOSPLAN from 1934 to 1937
- Valeri Nichushkin, Russian NHL hockey player
- Valery Ortiz, Puerto Rican actress
- Valeri Polyakov, Russian former Cosmonaut
- Valery Postnikov, former Russian hockey player and coach
- Valery Ponomarev, Ukrainian jazz musician
- Valeri Qazaishvili, Georgian international footballer
- Valery Rozov, former Russian BASE jumper
- Valery Sablin, (1939–1976) Soviet Navy Officer and mutineer
- Valery Shary, Belarusian Olympic champion weightlifter
- Valery Sigalevitch, Russian pianist
- Valeriy Sydorenko, Ukrainian boxer
- Valeriy Syutkin, Russian singer
- Valery Todorovsky, Russian film director
- Valery Wichman, LGBT rights activist from the Cook Islands
- Valeri Zolotukhin, Russian actor

== Surname ==
- Carl Valeri, Australian footballer
- Diego Valeri, Argentine football player
- Edmond Valléry Gressier, French lawyer
- Franca Valeri, Italian actress
- François Valéry, French singer-songwriter and composer
- Heike Vallery, German mechanical engineer
- Jean Joseph Valéry (1828–1879), French businessman, diplomat and senator.
- Paul Valéry, French author
- Josie Valeri, American soccer player

== Fictional characters ==
- Valery, a character in The Sopranos played by Vitali Baganov. Valery was a member of the Russian mob and acquainted with Tony Soprano.

== Other ==
- Valleri, a song performed by The Monkees

== See also ==
- Valerie (given name)
- Valerii (name)
- Valeriu (given name)
- Valerius (name)
- Valeria (given name)
- Valerian (name)
- Valeriano (name)
- Valerianus (disambiguation)
- Valer (disambiguation)
- Valera (disambiguation)
- Valérien (disambiguation)
- Vale (disambiguation)
- Vallery, France
- Walric, abbot of Leuconay
- Saint-Vaury
