= Valērijs =

- Gender: Male

Origin
- Origin: Latin nomen Valerius
- Region of origin: Italy

Valērijs or Valerijs is a given name. Notable people with the name include:

- Valērijs Agešins (born 1972), Latvian politician and lawyer
- Valērijs Belokoņs (born 1960), Latvian businessman and President of English football club Blackpool
- Valērijs Buhvalovs (born 1957), Latvian politician and pedagogue
- Valērijs Ivanovs (born 1970), Latvian footballer
- Valērijs Kargins (born 1961), Latvian economist and banker
- Valērijs Šabala (born 1994), Latvian footballer
- Valerijs Semjonovs (born 1958), Latvian footballer
- Valērijs Žolnerovičs (born 1985), Latvian Olympic athlete

== See also ==
- Valerij (given name)
- Valer (disambiguation)
