= Valera (crater) =

Crater on the Moon

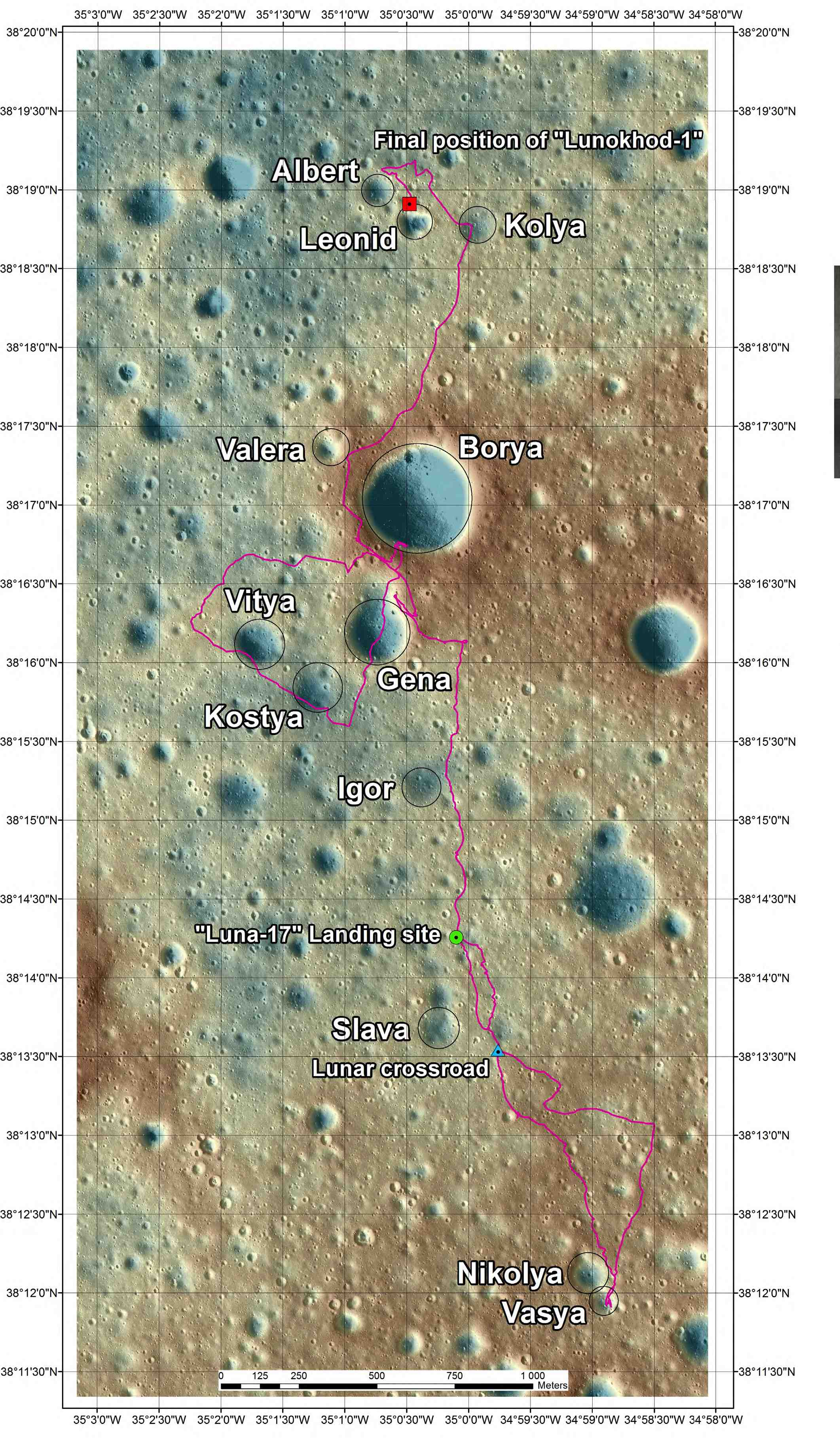
- Map of the minor features that the rover Lunokhod-1 passed
- Coordinates: 38.2895°N 35.002°W
- Diameter: 0.13 km
- Eponym: Russian male name

Valera is a tiny crater on the Moon. It is near the site where Soviet lunar rover Lunokhod 1 landed in November 1970, in the Mare Imbrium region. Its diameter is 0.13 km. The name Valera does not refer to a specific person; it is a Russian male name, a diminutive form of Valery.

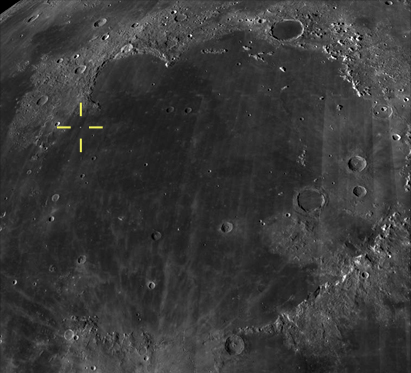
Valera is one of twelve named craters near the landing site, located in the northwest of Mare Imbrium

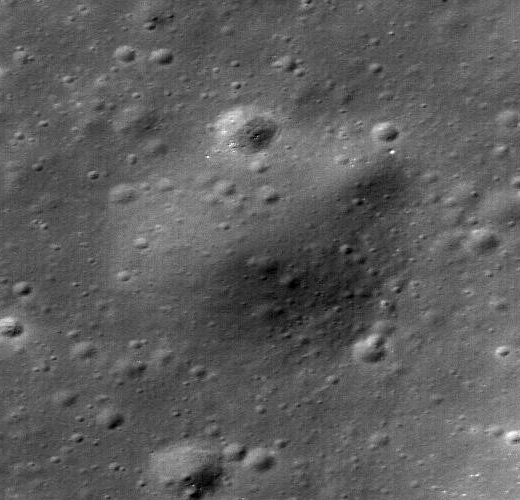
LRO image
