= Anatoly Voronovsky =

Russian politician

- Анатолий Вороновский
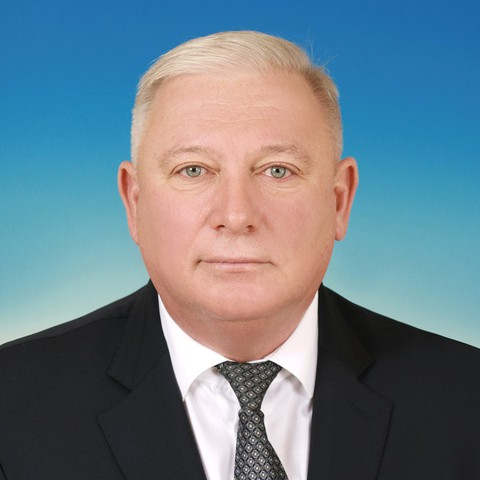

Deputy of the 8th State Duma
- In office 19 September 2021 – 2 December 2025
- Succeeded by: Valery Goryukhanov

Personal details
- Born: 28 December 1966 (age 59) Baku, Azerbaijan Soviet Socialist Republic, USSR
- Party: United Russia
- Education: Kirov Caspian Higher Naval School; Kuban State University

Anatoly Voronovsky (Russian: Анатолий Владимирович Вороновский; born 28 December 1966, Baku) is a Russian political figure and a deputy of the 8th State Duma.

After graduating from the Azerbaijan Higher Naval Academy, Voronovsky served in the Northern Fleet. In 1998 he started working at the department of internal security and the fight against corruption of the Office of the Federal Tax Police Service of the Russian Federation for Murmansk Oblast. From 2002 to 2005, he was the head of the Department for Civil Defense and Emergencies, Cossacks and Economic Affairs of the Administration of Ust-Labinsky District of Krasnodar Krai. In 2005, he became the head of the Ust-Labinsk administration. In 2008, he became the head of the Starominsky District. In 2015, he was appointed first deputy head, and later, the head of the Department of Transport of Krasnodar Krai. A year later, Voronovsky became the Minister of Transport and Road Facilities of Krasnodar Krai. From 2017 to 2020, he was the deputy governor of Krasnodar Krai. In 2020-2021, he worked as an advisor to the governor of the Krasnodar Krai Veniamin Kondratyev. In September 2021, he was elected as deputy of the 8th State Duma.

On 3 December 2025, he was removed as an MP by the State Duma amid a criminal investigation against him for allegedly accepting 25 million rubles ($323,000) in bribes tied to road construction contracts. At the time of his removal, he was confined in hospital after sustaining "serious injuries" from an accident the previous week.

== Sanctions ==
He was sanctioned by the UK government in 2022 in relation to the Russo-Ukrainian War.
