= Arcola, Liguria =

Arcola Arcoa
- Comune
- Comune di Arcola
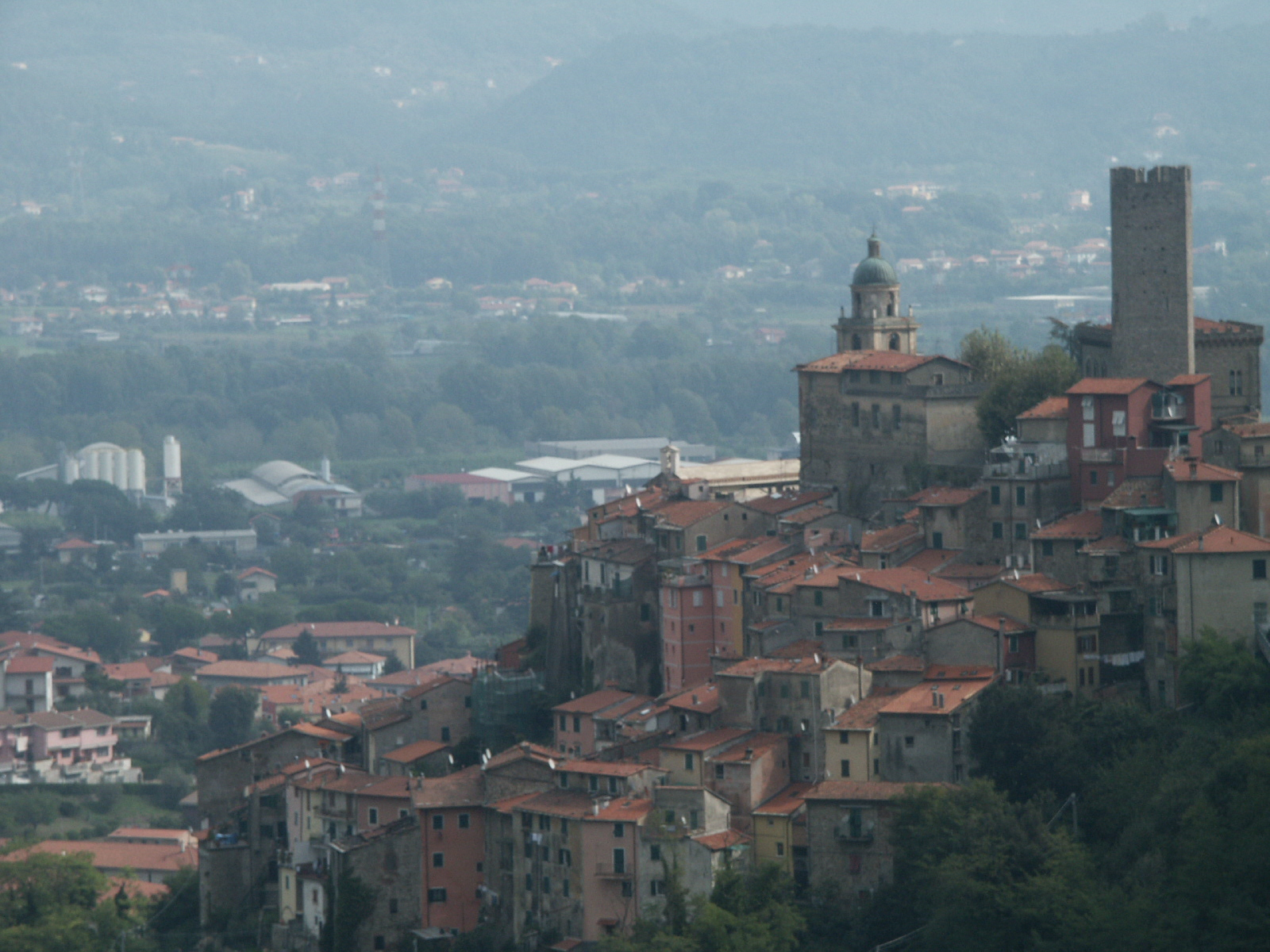
- Arcola

- Coat of arms

- Location of Arcola in Italy Arcola (Liguria)
- Coordinates: 44°7′N 9°54′E
- Country: Italy
- Region: Liguria
- Province: La Spezia (SP)
- Frazioni: Baccano, Battifollo, Cerri, Fresonara, Monti, Piano di Arcola, Ponte di Arcola, Ressora, Romito Magra, Termo-Pianazze e Trebiano

Area
  - Total: 16.4 km^{2} (6.3 sq mi)

Population (Dec. 2004)
  - Total: 10,145
  - Density: 619/km^{2} (1,600/sq mi)
- Demonym: Arcolani
- Time zone: UTC+1 (CET)
  - Summer (DST): UTC+2 (CEST)
- Postal code: 19021
- Dialing code: 0187
- Website: Official website

Arcola (Ligurian: Arcoa) is a commune in the Province of La Spezia, Liguria, Italy, located about 80 kilometres (50 mi) southeast of Genoa and about 7 kilometres (4 mi) northeast of La Spezia. As of 31 December 2004, it had a population of 10,145 and an area of 16.4 square kilometres (6.3 mi^{2}).

The municipality of Arcola contains the frazioni (subdivisions, mainly villages and hamlets) Baccano, Termo, Fresonara, Monti, Romito Magra, Cerri, and Trebiano.

Arcola borders the following municipalities: La Spezia, Lerici, Sarzana, Vezzano Ligure.

== Main sights ==
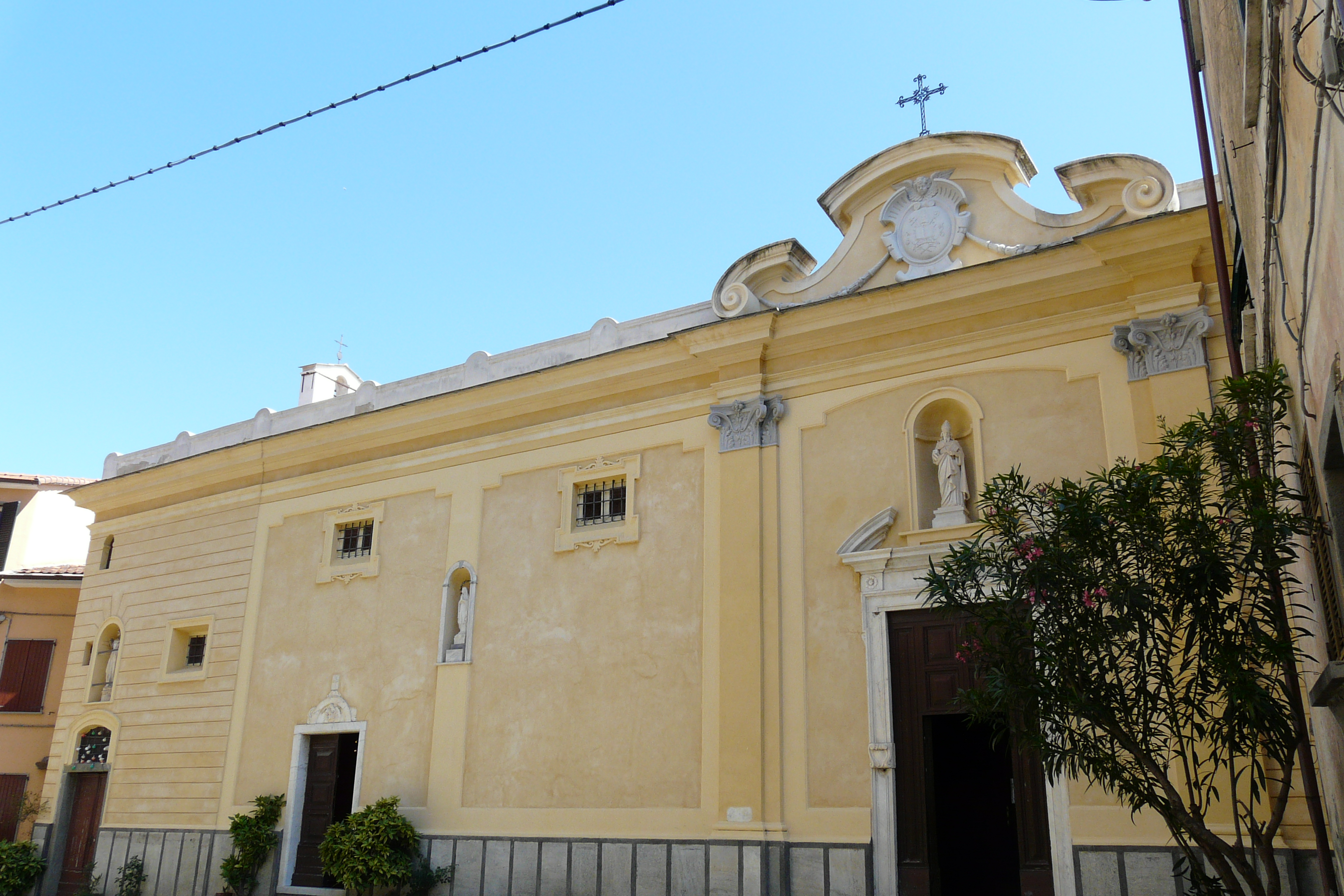
The parish church of San Nicolò in the main town

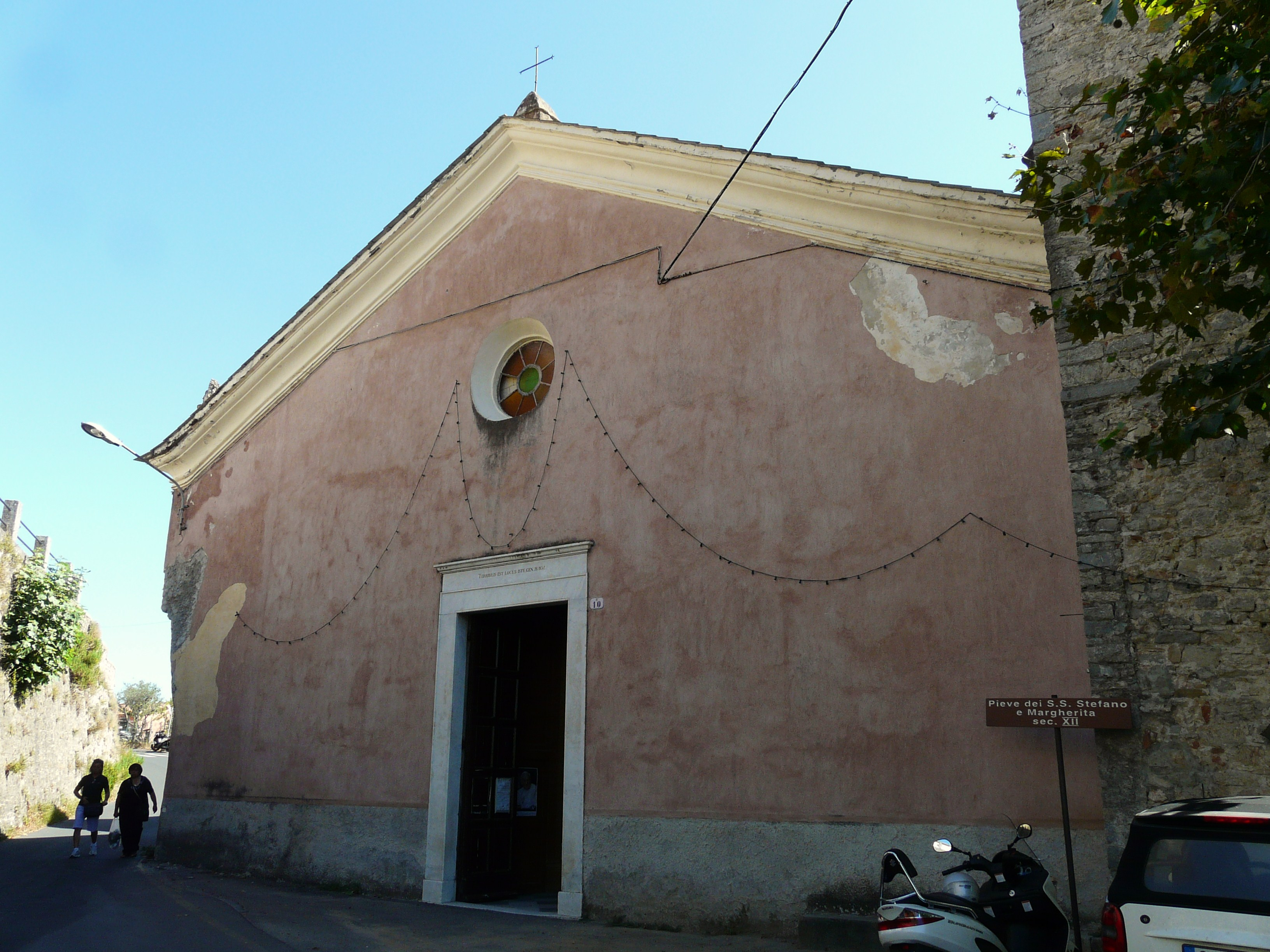
The parish church of Saints Stephen and Margaret in the hamlet of Baccano

The historic centre is characterised by a medieval layout of concentric rings with narrow cobbled lanes.

=== Religious architecture ===
- Santuario di Nostra Signora degli Angeli in the main town. It was built on the site where, according to tradition, a miraculous apparition of the Virgin took place on 21 May 1556. In 1558 the present underground chapel was built. A church above it was erected towards the end of the century, while the present sanctuary dates from the second half of the 18th century.
- Parish church of San Nicolò in the main town. It is mentioned in a document of 1132. It was enlarged in 1628 and completed in 1673. The church has three naves divided by six marble columns in the Tuscan order. Inside is a marble panel in high and low relief depicting the Madonna and Child between Saints Margaret of Antioch and Nicholas. The bell tower was erected in 1658.
- Parish church of San Rocco in the main town.
- Parish church of Saints Stephen and Margaret in the hamlet of Baccano. The church is recorded in a Papal bull of Pope Eugene III from 1149. It was remodelled in Gothic style with a square apse flanked by similar chapels and three naves with wide pointed arches. Inside is a 14th-century marble triptych showing the Blessed Virgin and Saints Peter and John the Baptist; outside is a fountain commissioned in 1626 by Giovanni Battista Salvago, bishop of Luni. Above the main portal is the Latin inscription Terribilis est locus iste.
- Oratory of the Annunciation in the hamlet of Baccano. The building stands within Villa Picedi Benettini and was commissioned by Camillo dei Conti Picedi in the first half of the 17th century.
- Parish church of Saint Anne in the hamlet of Cerri. It contains three paintings of the Genoese school dating from the 17th and 19th centuries.
- Oratory of Our Lady of the Snows in the hamlet of Monti, built in the second half of the 16th century.
- Parish church of San Rocco in the hamlet of Ponte di Arcola.
- Parish church of the Immaculate Conception in the hamlet of Romito Magra.
- Parish church of Saint Michael the Archangel in the hamlet of Trebiano. The church is mentioned in a papal bull of Pope Eugene III issued in 1149. The present building was erected in the 16th century on the site of an earlier structure. It is in Romanesque style and has three naves supported by eight columns of local red marble. On the sides there are four altars dedicated to Saint Catherine, Saint Bernard, Saint Roch and the Nativity. Inside the church is a Roman ara (altar) from Luni reused as a holy water stoup, a tempera-on-wood crucifix dated 1456, a marble altarpiece from the first half of the 16th century and an 18th-century Stations of the Cross.

=== Civil architecture ===
- Former Casalina hospital, dating from the late 15th century and now converted into a furniture factory, while still preserving 15th-century arcades and decorative elements.
- Villa il Chioso of the Picedi Benettini counts in the hamlet of Baccano. It consists of a central palace surrounded by a large walled park, laid out in its present form in 1910, and several ancillary buildings, including the small 17th-century Oratory of the Annunciation. The villa, whose construction date is uncertain but usually placed around the mid-18th century, was built for the Picedi Benettini family, whose descendants are still the owners. Cadastral records from 1557 confirm the presence of earlier rural buildings on the site. The main building houses the cellars of the associated farm and an old olive press.
- Villa Della Croce, a noble residence of the Federici family.

=== Military architecture ===
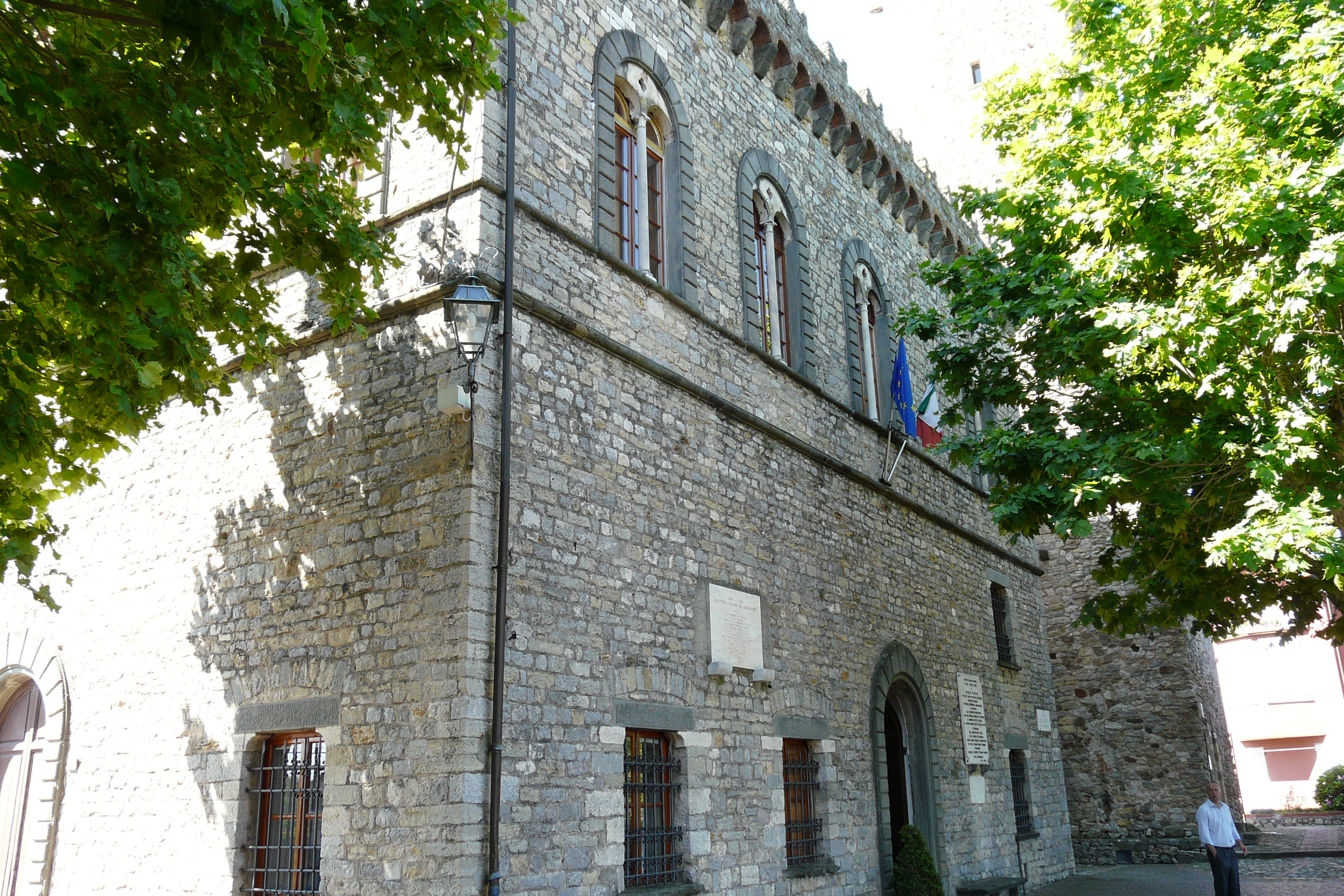
The Obertenghi castle, now the town hall

- Castello di Arcola (Arcola Castle). Standing on a hill above the town, with a strategic view over the plain of Sarzana and the mouth of the Magra river, the castle was built in the early 12th century by the Obertenghi family. During the 13th century it was subjected to several heavy sieges, including that by the Republic of Genoa in 1278 for control of the fief; only the nearby tower remained intact after the Genoese assault. Rebuilt from scratch and converted into a feudal palace in 1320, it was besieged by Castruccio Castracani, lord of Lucca, and in 1436 returned to Genoese control. The present palace, now the town hall, was built in 1885 on the site of the former Obertenghi castle.
- Pentagonal Obertenghi tower, built near the castle. It is the only surviving contemporary structure from the original castle built by the Obertenghi in the 10th century. Sixteen metres high and pentagonal in plan, it has crenellations and small windows at the top. Between the tower and the town hall square there is an old marble basin used to measure the volume of half a barrel of wine; an inscription shows that the unit of measure was that used in Genoa in 1601.
- Castello di Trebiano (Trebiano Castle). First mentioned in an imperial charter of 963 issued by Otto I, it was built by the bishops of Luni, who used it as a stronghold on the hilltop. In 1039, together with the rest of the fief, it passed to the lords of Trebiano, who were closely linked to the Lunigiana diocese. Despite the imposing size of the structure, which suggests a defensive role, the bishops used it as a simple seigneurial residence.
- Forte di Canarbino (Canarbino Fort). On the administrative boundary between Arcola and Lerici, at the top of the ridge overlooking the village of Pitelli, lies the locality of Canarbino, site of a 19th-century military fort that forms part of the fortifications of the Gulf of La Spezia. The building retains its original structure, including ditches and curtain walls, and is currently used as a shooting range.

== Demographic evolution ==
Historical population

Year	Pop.	±%
1861	1,737	—
1871	2,060	+18.6%
1881	2,277	+10.5%
1901	3,979	+74.7%
1911	4,836	+21.5%

Year	Pop.	±%
1921	6,167	+27.5%
1931	6,835	+10.8%
1936	7,225	+5.7%
1951	8,033	+11.2%
1961	8,093	+0.7%

Year	Pop.	±%
1971	8,680	+7.3%
1981	9,560	+10.1%
1991	9,579	+0.2%
2001	9,914	+3.5%

Source: Data from ISTAT
