= Valmai =

- Gender: Feminine
- Language: Welsh

Origin
- Meaning: Literary invented name meaning "like May”

Other names
- Variant forms: Falmai, Felmai, Valmae, Valmaie, Valmay, Valmaye
- Short form: Val

Valmai is a feminine given name derived from the Welsh phrase fel Mai, meaning "like May," that was invented by Welsh bestselling novelist Allen Raine for the heroine of her 1899 romance novel By Berwen Banks. The 1920 British silent romance movie By Berwin Banks was based upon the novel and starred Eileen Magrath as Valmai Powell, Girls in English-speaking countries were named after the romantic heroine. The name has multiple spelling variants.

== Usage ==
Valmai was particularly well-used in Australia and New Zealand in the 1920s and 1930s. It ranked among the 100 most popular names for girls in New Zealand between 1928 and 1933. The name and its variants were also in use in the United Kingdom. Valmai and its variants were also in rare use in the United States in the first half of the 20th century.

== Women ==
- Valmai Gee (born 1971), Bolivian-born Irish former cricketer
- Valmai Holt (née Williams; 1935–2026), British military historian, author, and pioneer of modern battlefield tours
- Valmai Pidgeon (née Miller; born c. 1927–2026), Australian businesswoman
- Valmai "Val" Slater (born 1933), Australian former cricketer

== Fictional characters ==
- Valmai Gittis, daughter of Australian comedic character Dame Edna Everage
- Valmai Morgan, a Chaser for the all-female Quidditch team Holyhead Harpies in the 1990s, in the Daily Prophet newsletters by J.K. Rowling
- Valmai Powell, the heroine of the 1899 romance novel By Berwen Banks by Allen Raine and of the 1920 British silent movie By Berwin Banks based on the novel
- Valmai Seacliff, a character in the 1938 detective novel Artists in Crime by New Zealand writer Ngaio Marsh
