= Emmanuel Ghent =

Canadian-American composer and psychiatrist

- Born: 15 May 1925; Montreal, Quebec
- Died: 31 March 2003 (aged 77); New York City
- Known for: Clinical concept of surrender; electronic music
- Scientific career
- Fields: Relational psychoanalysis

Emmanuel Robert Ghent (May 15, 1925 in Montréal, Quebec – March 31, 2003 in New York City, USA) was a pioneering composer of electronic music and a psychiatric practitioner, researcher, and teacher.

== Biography ==
Emmanuel Ghent was born in Montreal, Quebec. He grew up in Montreal and attended McGill University to study medicine. After graduating, he moved to New York City to continue his psychiatric training. He remained there all his life, practicing in New York and eventually becoming a clinical professor of psychology at the postdoctoral program in psychoanalysis at New York University. Throughout his life, Ghent worked to expand his field of psychoanalysis beyond psychiatric practitioners.

Emmanuel is the father of Valerie Ghent. He died in New York City.

== Work ==
=== Psychology ===
Emmanuel Ghent was a key figure of the relational psychoanalysis movement, belonging to its first generation alongside Adrienne Harris, Stephen Mitchell, Muriel Dimen, and Ruth Stein. His most famous contribution to that tradition is his 1990 paper "Masochism, Submission, Surrender—Masochism as a Perversion of Surrender", in which Ghent distinguishes submission from surrender, with the latter serving as a foundation for clinical practice. The patient is not so much expected to "submit", but rather surrender their defenses.

=== Music ===
Ghent was also an amateur oboist and composer of electronic music. In the 1960s, Ghent pioneered the concept of electronic music by adapting a computer system, initially designed to synthesize the human voice, to instead synthesize music. With the advent of more sophisticated computer systems in the 1970s, Ghent was able to synchronize the lighting of the theater with the synthesized music. Ghent could thus create music that combined music, dance and light patterns. In fact, several of his most famous compositions used this idea, most notably "Phosphones" and "Five Brass Voices for Computer-Generated Tape." Ghent wrote non-electronic music too, including "Entelechy for Viola and Piano" and "25 Songs for Children and All Their Friends" (written to commemorate the birth of Ghent's third daughter, Theresa Ghent Locklear).

== Publications ==
=== Complete psychological writings ===
- 1950: Psyche and Eye, in McGill Medical Journal, 19(2), pp. 101–117
- 1962: Countertransference: Its Reflection in the Process of Peer-group Supervision (with Chaim F. Shatan, Benjamin Brody). International Journal of Group Psychotherapy, 12(3), pp. 335–346.
- 1989: Credo: The Dialectics of One-Person and Two-Person Psychologies. Contemporary Psychoanalysis, 25(2), pp. 169–211
- 1990: Masochism, Submission, Surrender: Masochism as a Perversion of Surrender. Contemporary Psychoanalysis, 26(1), pp. 108–136
- 1992: Paradox and Process. Psychoanalytic Dialogues, 2(2), pp. 135–159
- 1995: Interaction in the Psychoanalytic Situation. Psychoanalytic Dialogues, 5(3), pp. 479–491.
- 2000: On Relational Psychoanalysis: An Interview with Dr Emmanuel Ghent (with Lewis Aron)
- 2002: Wish, Need, Drive: Motive in the Light of Dynamic Systems Theory and Edelman’s Selectionist Theory. Psychoanalytic Dialogues, 12(5), pp. 763–808
- 2002: Relations: Introduction to the First IARPP Conference. IARPP eNews, 1(1), pp. 7–9
- 2018: The collected papers of Emmanuel Ghent: heart melts forward. Routledge: London and New York

=== Selected compositions and musicological writings ===
- 1965: Quintet for brass instruments (score)
- 1977: Interactive Compositional Algorithms. University of Michigan: Ann Arbor, MI
- 1978: Further Studies in Compositional Algorithms. University of Michigan: Ann Arbor, MI
