= Valarie =

Valarie is a given name, similar to Valerie.

- Valarie Allman (born 1995), American track and field athlete
- Valarie D'Elia (1960–2024), American travel writer and television host
- Valarie Hodges (born 1955), American businesswoman and politician.
- Valarie Jenkins (born 1986), American disc golfer.
- Valarie Kaur (born 1981), American civil rights activist, documentary filmmaker, lawyer, educator and faith leader.
- Valarie Lawson (born 1966), American politician
- Valarie Rae Miller (born 1974), American actress
- Valarie McCall (born 1972), American civil servant
- Valarie Pettiford (born 1960), American stage and television actress, dancer, and jazz singer
- Valarie Sion (born 1995), American track and field athlete
- Valarie Zeithaml, American marketing professor and author
