= Valerij =

- Gender: Male

Origin
- Origin: Latin nomen Valerius
- Region of origin: Italy

Valerij is a given name. Notable people with the name include:

- Valerij Popov, Russian chess player. He was awarded the title Grandmaster by FIDE in 1999. Popov won the championship
- Valerij Zhuravliov, Soviet/Latvian chess master
- Valerij Verhušin, Macedonian wrestler

== See also ==
- Valērijs (given name)
- Valer (disambiguation)
