= Vezzano Ligure =

- Comune
- Comune di Vezzano Ligure
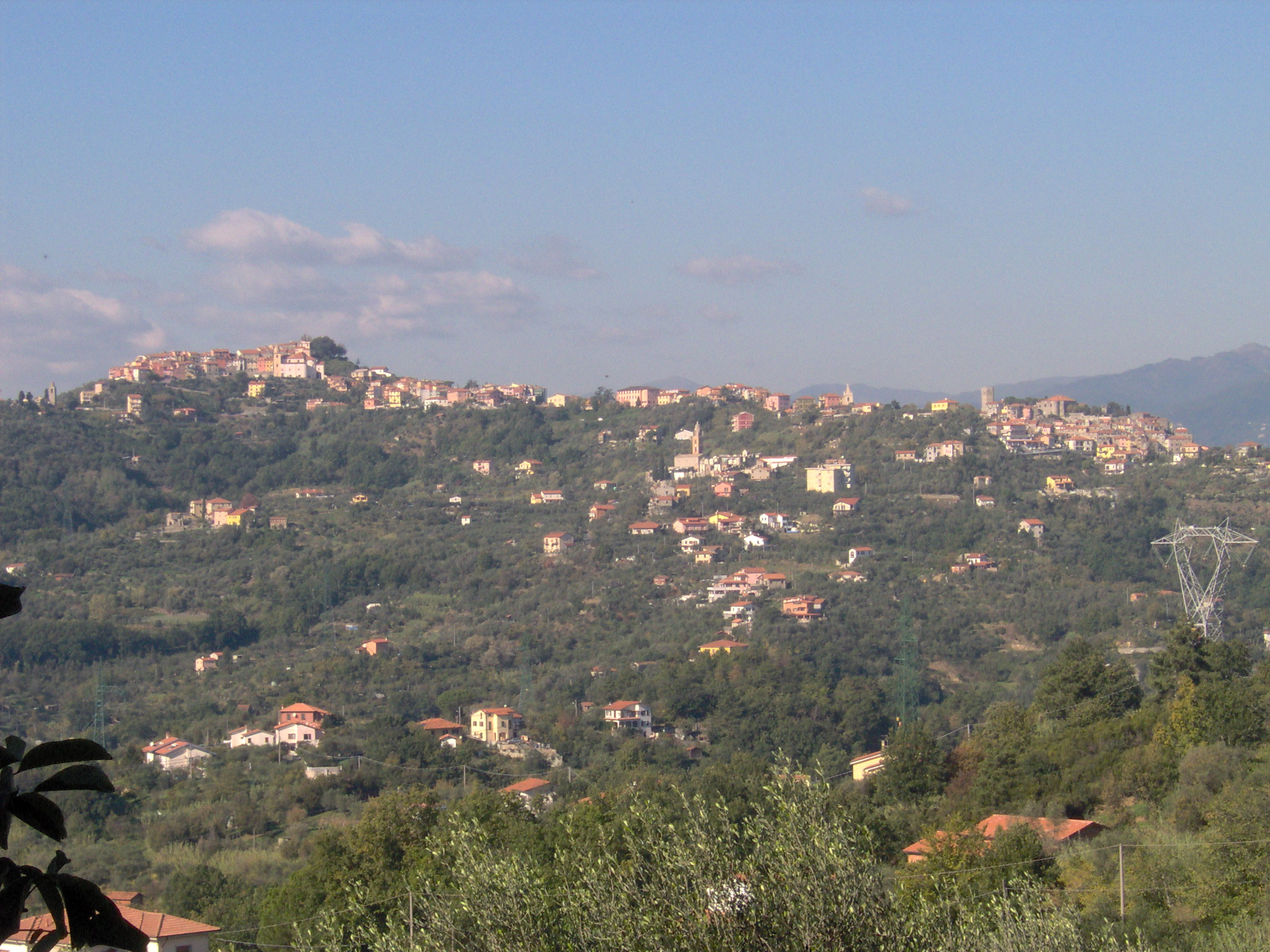

- Coat of arms

- Location within Italy Location within Liguria
- Coordinates: 44°8′N 9°53′E
- Country: Italy
- Region: Liguria
- Province: La Spezia (SP)
- Frazioni: Vezzano Superiore, Vezzano Inferiore, Valeriano-Buonviaggio-Carozzo, Bottagna-Piano di Valeriano-Lagoscuro, Piano di Vezzano I e II, Prati-Fornola, Valeriano Lunense

Government
  - Mayor: Fiorenzo Abruzzo

Area
  - Total: 18.4 km^{2} (7.1 sq mi)
- Elevation: 271 m (889 ft)

Population (31 December 2008)
  - Total: 7,397
  - Density: 402/km^{2} (1,040/sq mi)
- Demonym: Vezzanesi
- Time zone: UTC+1 (CET)
  - Summer (DST): UTC+2 (CEST)
- Postal code: 19020
- Dialing code: 0187
- Website: Official website

Vezzano Ligure (Italian: [vetˈtsaːno ˈliːɡure]; Ligurian: Vessan, locally V'zan) is a comune (municipality) in the Province of La Spezia in the Italian region of Liguria, located about 80 kilometres (50 mi) southeast of Genoa and about 7 kilometres (4 mi) northeast of La Spezia.

Vezzano Ligure borders the following municipalities: Arcola, Bolano, Follo, La Spezia, Santo Stefano di Magra, Sarzana.

== Main sights ==
- Church of Nostra Signora del Soccorso (18th century)
- Romanesque church of Santa Maria Assunta (12th century)
- Parish church of San Sebastiano and Santa Maria Assunta (17th century)
- Pentagonal tower (13th century)
- Remains of the castle of Vezzano Superiore

== Economy ==
Agriculture includes vines and olive trees with consequent production of grapes, wine and olive oil. Tourism is also active, as well as service companies working for the La Spezia intermodal port.

== Transport ==
Vezzano Ligure is served by a railway station on the lines Genoa-Rome and Parma-La Spezia located downhill from the center of the old town.

The nearest motorway is the A15 with a marked westbound exit and eastbound entrance between Santo Stefano and La Spezia.

== See also ==
- Liguria wine
