= Valerie Velazquez =

American singer, philanthropist and creative entrepreneur

- Born: July 6, 1985 (age 41); San Antonio, Texas, U.S.
- Occupations: Former Miss Texas Latina USA, singer, actress, producer, entrepreneur
- Height: 5 ft 3 in (1.60 m)
- Website: valerievelazquez.com

Valerie Velazquez (born July 6, 1985) is an American National Top 5 Finalist in the Miss Latina US Pageant, singer, philanthropist and creative entrepreneur. Velazquez represented Texas as a two time Miss Texas in 2008 & 2009 and finished 3rd Runner-up in the National beauty competition representing her Mexican, Spanish, and Italian heritage. Velazquez is on the Board Of Directors of 501 (c) (3) non-profit Beauty for Freedom in New York City where she campaigns to end human trafficking. She's worked with Grammy Nominated Producer Mack Damon on a track for action film Machete directed by Robert Rodriguez and Ethan Maniquis, however the song was not chosen for final film release. In July 2016 Velazquez was asked to ring the Nasdaq Opening Bell at the Opening Bell Ceremony to raise awareness for her ongoing efforts in philanthropy and causes. Velazquez now resides in Manhattan.

== Life and career ==
Born in Texas, she was raised in San Antonio and attended Texas State University where she became the first Latina to be named Best Actress in university history for her role as Audrey in Little Shop Of Horrors. Prior to, Velazquez performed the national anthem for former President of the United States, the then Governor of Texas, George W. Bush at the Texas Capitol in Austin to raise awareness for the National Red Ribbon Campaign. She began her early singing career performing at various San Antonio Spurs National Basketball Association games at the San Antonio Alamodome and AT&T Center from 1996 to 2011, and in 1998 performed the national anthem for the Boxing Lightweight Division World Championship bout of Azumah Nelson and Jesse James Leija which would be the late Azumah Nelson's final bout. In 2011 she left entertainment after personal struggles and the death of her late father which she explained on Catholic radio show, Mary's Touch. She began a full-time career as a philanthropist and entrepreneur.

In 2011 she produced STRUT 512 which was announced as Austin's Official Day of Proclamation by Mayor Lee Leffingwell in celebration of Austin's food, fashion, and philanthropy. In 2014 she produced The Better World Awards honoring those who better the world during the Formula One race in the United States. She awarded Pamela Anderson for her activism in Animal Rights with Peta, alongside Kweku Mandela, grandson of Nelson Mandela.
