= Beauty for Freedom =

- Formation: 2014
- Founder: Monica Watkins, Jerry Chu
- Founded at: New York City
- Purpose: Anti-human-trafficking advocacy and support for trafficking victims
- Website: beautyforfreedom.org

Beauty for Freedom is a nonprofit organization that raises awareness and funds to fight human trafficking. Some of its main programs include art therapy and photography for victims of trafficking.

== History ==
Beauty for Freedom was founded in 2014 by Monica Watkins and Jerry Chu. Watkins founded the organization after seeing the amount of human trafficking that took place in Haiti after the 2010 Haiti earthquake. It was initially founded to raise awareness and funds for other non-profits involved in human trafficking rescue, but later expanded into its own programs involving art and photography.

The organization is made up of people from various industries including fashion, art, and entertainment. In 2015, it launched a creative arts program which sends artists to areas with youth affected by trafficking to conduct therapy art. The art has been used in collaborations with photographer Erica Simone. A total of 15 artists took part in the program which was in partnership with Challenging Heights, with a final exhibit of the art being displayed in New York City.

In addition to Challenging Heights, Beauty for Freedom has partnered with other organizations such as Parsons the New School of Design and Prinkshop. It has provided services to more than 3,500 survivors of human trafficking as of 2021. It has also published two books and provided services for international missions in Ghana, India, the Dominican Republic, Haiti, and Cambodia.

== See also ==
- Trafficking of children
- Transnational efforts to prevent human trafficking
