= Challenging Heights =

Ghanaian nongovernmental organization

Challenging Heights is a non-governmental organization in Ghana protecting the rights of children and focusing its anti-trafficking efforts in the fishing and cocoa industry. It was founded by James Kofi Annan. According to Challenging Heights, over 24,000 children in Ghana fall victim to the worst forms of child labour annually. Challenging Heights' aim is to end child trafficking through Rescue & Recovery, Prevention, and Advocacy.

== Mission ==
"To ensure a secured, protected and dignified future and life for children and youth by promoting their rights, education and health."

== Media References ==
- Coverage of Challenging Heights on CNN International's Inside Africa television feature

== See also ==
- Child slavery
- Trafficking of children
- Human trafficking
