= Saint Valerie =

Saint Valerie may refer to:

- Valerie of Limoges, according to legend, an associate of Saint Martial, a cephalophoric martyr
- Valeria of Milan, often known as St Valerie, venerated in Thibodaux, Louisiana
- Valeria, a Christian saint martyred with Anesius
