= Vålerenga (disambiguation) =

Vålerenga is a neighborhood in the city of Oslo, Norway

Vålerenga may also refer to:

- Vålerengens Idrettsforening, a multi-sports club commonly referred to as Vålerenga or VIF
- Vålerenga Fotball, the association football department of VIF
  - Vålerenga Fotball Damer, the ladies' football department
- Vålerenga Ishockey, the ice hockey department of VIF
- Vålerenga Trolls, the American football department of VIF
- Vålerenga Church, iconic church located at Vålerenga, Oslo
