= Valerijs Semjonovs =

Latvian footballer

Valerijs Semjonovs (born 7 August 1958) is a former Latvian footballer who for the most of his career played for FK Daugava Rīga. He played as a forward.

== Playing biography ==
Semjonovs was offered to join Daugava after his superb performance in the youth tournament Pārceltuve (he was selected best forward of the tournament). In Daugava he played from 1978 to 1989 (for one season he played with FC Karpaty Lviv during army duty), scoring 48 goals in 302 matches. His strong sides were speed and good technique however he often failed to score from very good opportunities. His most successful seasons with Daugava were in 1979 (10 goals) and 1981 (16 goals), but later in the career his performance declined. In different stages of his career Semjonovs also played on different positions on the field - he started as a forward but also sometimes played in defense and as a half-back. After the end of playing on a professional level Semjonovs played football on amateur level in Riga, went on to coaching (worked with the Latvia U16 national football team) and founded a sports club. In 2005 Semjonovs was a candidate in the elections for Riga City Council.
