= Pitelli =

Village in Liguria, Italy

- Frazione
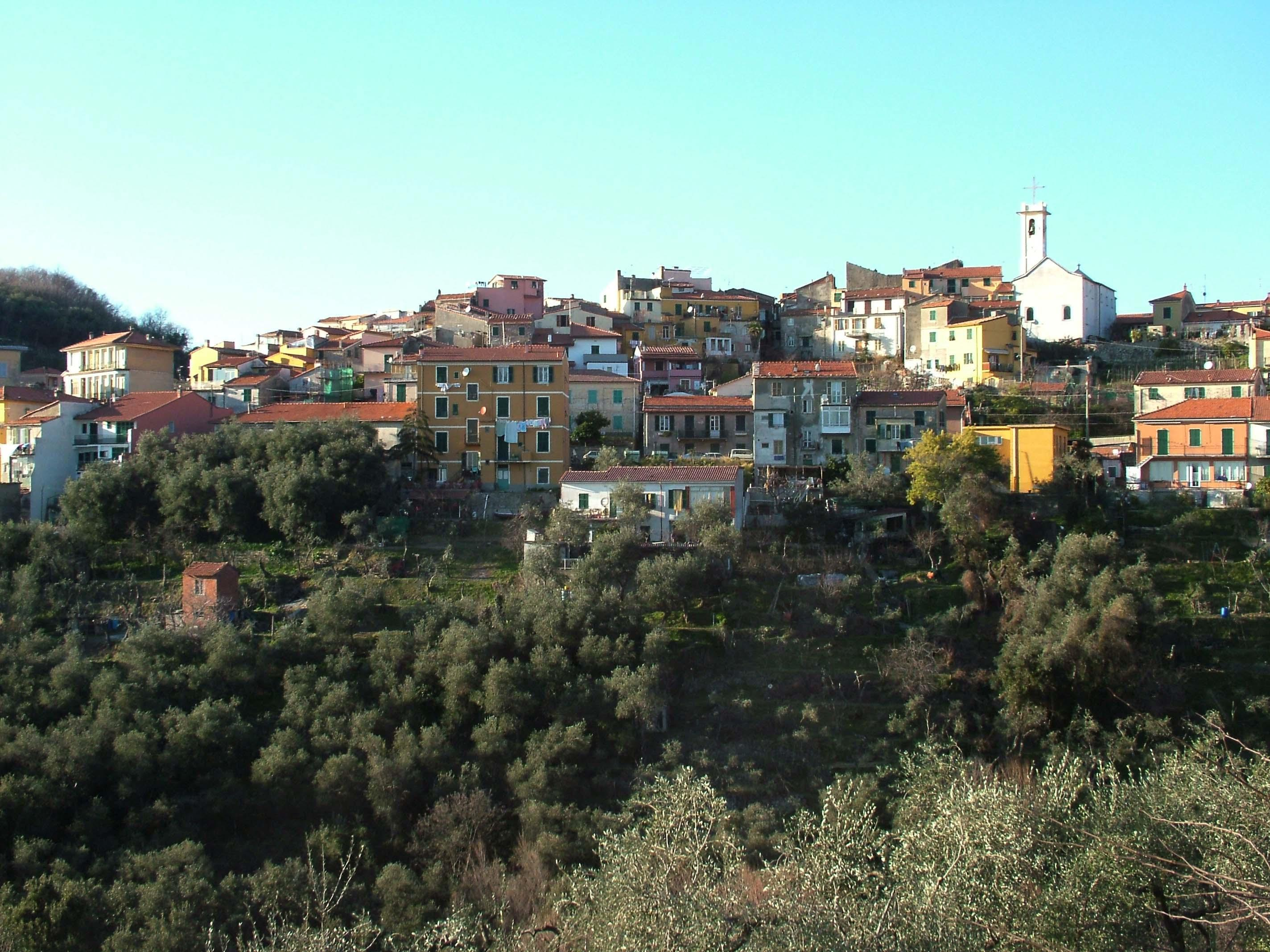
- View of Pitelli

- Location of Pitelli in Italy
- Coordinates: 44.095095°N 9.885219°E
- Country: Italy
- Region: Liguria
- Province: La Spezia
- Comune: La Spezia

Area
  - Total: 0.1832 km^{2} (0.0707 sq mi)
- Elevation: 128 m (420 ft)

Population (2021)
  - Total: 875
  - Density: 4,780/km^{2} (12,400/sq mi)
- Demonym: Pitellesi
- Time zone: UTC+1 (CET)
  - Summer (DST): UTC+2 (CEST)
- Postal code: 19137
- Dialing code: 0187
- Patron saint: St. Bartholomew
- Saint day: St. Bartholomew's Day, 24th August

Pitelli is a hillside village and frazione of the Province of La Spezia, Italy close to the Montemarcello-Magra-Vara Regional Park and the Bay of La Spezia. It was founded in the 16th century in the wake of the desertion of the medieval port city of San Bartolomeo delle Cento Chiavi. According to a 2021 census, Pitelli has around 875 inhabitants. It is administratively part of the Comune of La Spezia but is situated on the border with the Comune of Lerici.

== Etymology ==
According to tradition, Pitelli owes its name to the Latin name Petell(i)us orPitell(i)us, referring to an ancient Roman family of consuls, the Pitillis, who are claimed to have stayed in the region. The name 'Pitelli' was first mentioned in a papal bull of Pope Eugene III in 1149.

== History ==
=== Medieval ===
Pitelli's origins come from the medieval port city of San Bartolomeo delle Cento Chiavi, the name of which was first cited in a list of tithes dating to the 13th century. The village operated a hospital facility called Centum Clavibus. The locality was dependent on the nearby pieve of Arcola, which was united to the Episcopal mense of Sarzana by a papal bull introduced by Pope Pius IV in 1564.

=== Modern ===
In the 16th century, the inhabitants of San Bartolomeo delle Cento Chiavi fled inland into the hills of Pitelli to escape the frequent corsair raids. A small oratory was erected as their provisional place of worship in 1580. On March 26, 1584, the Pitellesi requested autonomy from the Pieve of Arcola of the visiting Monsignor Angelo Peruzzi, who instead decreed that mass would be held each Sunday in Arcola, forcing the Pitellesi to travel a mile or so away to attend it. A painting of the crucifixion of Jesus dated 1590, which underwent restoration in 2018, served as its altarpiece.

A papal bull issued by cardinal Domenico Spinola on May 9, 1634 allowed Pitelli to form its own parish autonomous from Arcola. When the old oratory proved insufficient in accommodating the needs of Pitelli's growing population, the village's parish church of baroque style was consecrated in 1734.

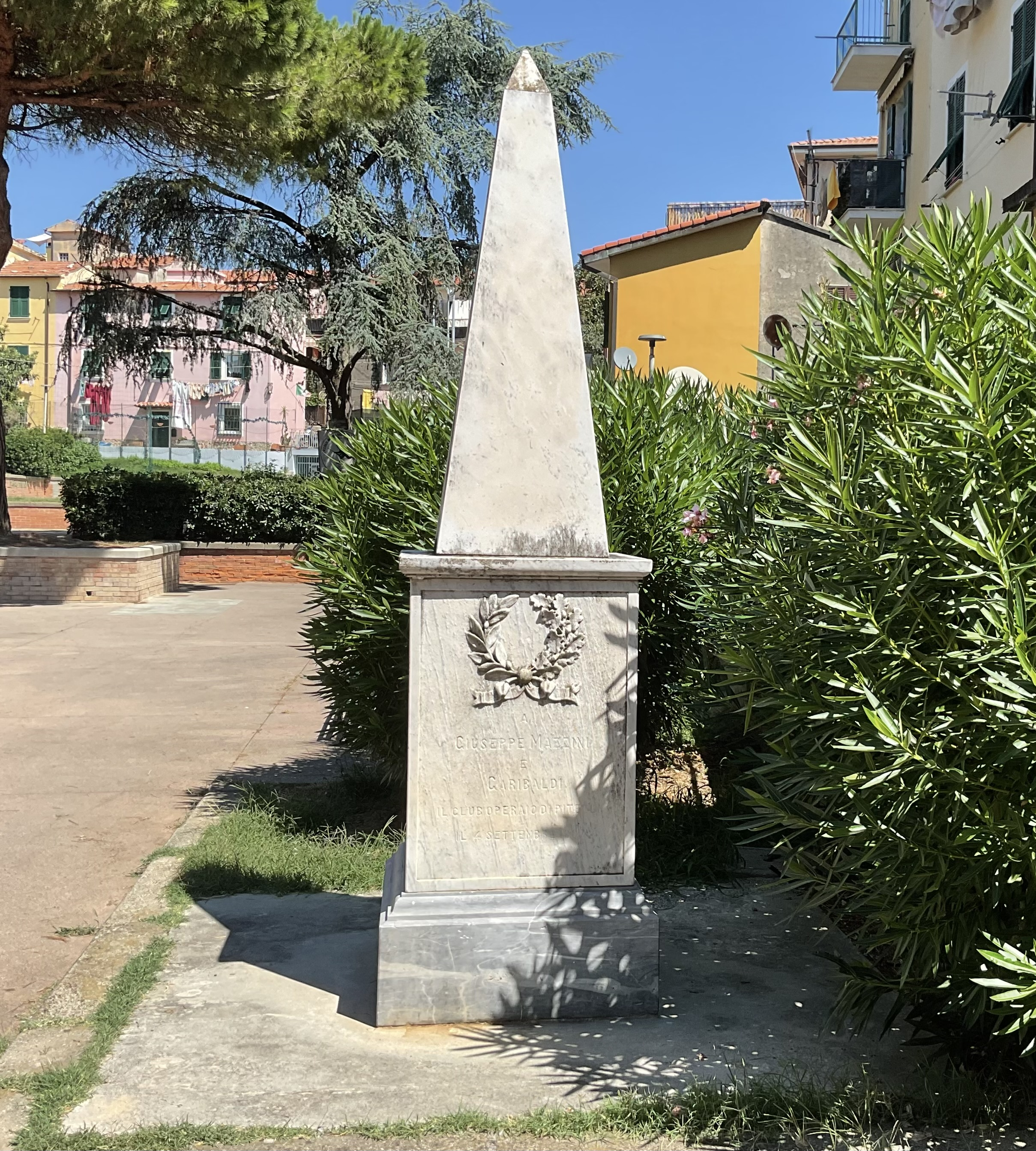
Monument to the revolutionary youth club of Pitelli, dedicated to Giuseppe Mazzini and Garibaldi.

Pitelli underwent a population growth stimulated by an influx of workers moving there due to its proximity to nearby factories. The population grew from 1,000 inhabitants in 1880 to 2,700 in 1930. During this period, revolutionary and socialist ideas were cultivated in Pitelli, having spread from neighbouring towns. Multiple workers' strikes were organised, the most remembered one taking place in 1890. A Republican collective of Pitelli was established, in honour of which a monument was erected in 1887.

Fascists would also grow in number and in 1921-1922 and tensions escalated between socialists and fascists of Pitelli, with some outbreaks of violence occurring.

In 1928 Pitelli was split off from the municipality of Arcola and transferred to La Spezia. The current parish church, housing a nursery, was built under the watch of Monsignor Guido Chella, who was in office from 1945-93.

== Geography ==
=== Environment ===
Pitelli is close to the Montemarcello-Magra-Vara regional park.

In February 2024, the road of Località Maggiola leading up to Pitelli was disrupted by a landslide caused by adverse weather conditions. A construction site was created for the area in which the landfill occurred and an allocation of €80,000 was set aside for the restoration of the road in November the same year.

==== Pitelli landfill ====
The Pitelli landfill was a site of waste disposal close to the village from the late 20th to early 21st century until environmental concerns were raised in government about the harmful effects of the site. The site has undergone numerous inspections and management programs in the years prior to 2000. By ministerial decree, the management of the site was delegated to the Ligurian regional government as it was evaluated that it no longer required national attention.

=== Climate ===
Climate data for Pitelli
| Month | Jan | Feb | Mar | Apr | May | Jun | Jul | Aug | Sep | Oct | Nov | Dec | Year |
|---|---|---|---|---|---|---|---|---|---|---|---|---|---|
| Mean daily maximum °F (°C) | 52 (11) | 54 (12) | 57 (14) | 63 (17) | 70 (21) | 77 (25) | 82 (28) | 82 (28) | 75 (24) | 68 (20) | 59 (15) | 54 (12) | 66 (19) |
| Daily mean °F (°C) | 45 (7) | 46 (8) | 52 (11) | 57 (14) | 64 (18) | 70 (21) | 75 (24) | 75 (24) | 68 (20) | 61 (16) | 54 (12) | 48 (9) | 60 (15) |
| Mean daily minimum °F (°C) | 39 (4) | 39 (4) | 45 (7) | 50 (10) | 57 (14) | 63 (17) | 66 (19) | 66 (19) | 61 (16) | 55 (13) | 48 (9) | 43 (6) | 53 (12) |
| Average precipitation inches (mm) | 2.19 (55.6) | 2.04 (51.7) | 2.08 (52.9) | 2.48 (63.1) | 1.94 (49.2) | 1.61 (41.0) | 0.94 (23.8) | 1.54 (39.0) | 2.86 (72.7) | 4.16 (105.7) | 3.93 (99.7) | 2.59 (65.8) | 28.36 (720.2) |
| Average rainy days | 6.7 | 5.8 | 6.3 | 8.5 | 7.4 | 5.8 | 3.8 | 4.7 | 7.2 | 9.4 | 9.0 | 7.7 | 82.3 |

== Main sights ==
- The Parrocchia di San Bartolomeo (Parish church of Saint Bartholomew)
- The monument at the Piazza degli Orti commemorating the city's revolutionary political vocation
- The oratory of San Bartolomeo and Santa Maddalena
- The Piccolo Museo della Grande Guerra (Little museum of the Great War) opened in August 2020
