= Valerie Ghent =

American singer-songwriter

- Born: May 2, 1964 (age 62); New York City, United States
- Genres: Soul, R&B, blues, jazz, rock, pop, chanson
- Occupations: Singer-songwriter, musician, composer, record producer, audio engineer
- Instruments: Piano, keyboards, voice
- Years active: 1980–present
- Website: www.valerieghent.com

Valerie Ghent (born May 2, 1964) is an American singer, songwriter, musician, record producer, and recording engineer from New York City. She began by playing the piano at age three and started taking cello lessons at the age of five before beginning to write songs when she was eight years old. Ghent later began her performing career when she joined Dizzy and the Romilars at the age of 15.

== Biography ==
Ghent was born in New York City. Her father is Emmanuel Ghent.

Ghent is a longtime keyboardist, vocalist and engineer with Ashford & Simpson. As a solo artist, Ghent has released five albums under her own name: Unstoppable (1996), Day to Day Dream (2012), Muse (2014), Velours (2016), and The French Sessions (2017), and a remake of the Ben E. King hit Supernatural Thing (2013). Her first solo album, Unstoppable, was self-recorded with Jimmy Biondolillo employed as co-producer. In 2012 the single "Love Enough For a Lifetime" from Day to Day Dream hit No. 1 on iHeart Radio. Velours, which features 11 original songs written by Ghent, was recorded in the South of France and in New York., SoulTracks named Velours one of the Top 50 Albums of 2016.

Ghent has toured, performed and recorded with world-renowned artists including Ashford & Simpson, Debbie Harry, Grayson Hugh, Defunkt, Valerie Simpson, Dr. Maya Angelou, Billy Preston, TM Stevens, and has worked as a recording engineer with Ashford & Simpson, Sir Cliff Richard, Nina Simone, Roberta Flack, and Luther Vandross.

Ghent started performing and touring in France in 2014 with French musicians affiliated with Association BLUES'UP, and recorded two more albums, Velours (2016) in New York and the South of France, and The French Sessions (2017), the latter recorded entirely in France and released on the Blanc Musiques label.

== Discography ==
=== Solo ===
- The French Sessions – Valerie Ghent (Blanc Musiques, 2017)
- Velours – Valerie Ghent (West Street, 2016)
- Muse – Valerie Ghent (West Street, 2014)
- Supernatural Thing – Valerie Ghent (West Street, 2013)
- Day to Day Dream – Valerie Ghent (West Street, 2012)
- Unstoppable – Valerie Ghent (West Street, 1996)

=== With Ashford and Simpson ===
- Soulicious – The Soul Album – Cliff Richard featuring Roberta Flack, Valerie Simpson & Peabo Bryson (EMI, 2011)
- The Real Thing – Live DVD & CD – Ashford & Simpson (Sony, 2009)
- Uh Uh Ooh Ooh Look Out Here It Comes- Down in the Delta soundtrack (Virgin, 1998)
- Been Found – Ashford & Simpson with Maya Angelou (Hopsack & Silk, 1996)
- It's in There – Jennifer Holiday (Arista, 1991)
- Hungry for Me Again – Ashford & Simpson (Capitol, 1990)

=== With Valerie Simpson ===
- Dinosaurs Are Coming Back Again – Valerie Simpson featuring Nina Simone & Roberta Flack (Hopsack & Silk, 2012)
- Now Love Has No End – Michael Franks & Valerie Simpson (Windham Hill/BMG, 1999)

=== With Mike Thorne ===
- Fantastic Star – Mark Almond (Some Bizarre, 1996)
- Strange Angels – Laurie Anderson (Warner Bros, 1989)
- Diary of a Hollow Horse – China Crisis (A&M, 1989)
- Song from the Edge of the World – Siouxsie and the Banshees (Polydor, 1987)
- Everybody's Got A Little....Soul – Carmel (1987)
- The Communards – The Communards (1985)
- Don't Leave Me This Way – The Communards (1985)
- You Are My World – The Communards (1985)

=== Additional selected discography ===
- Mosaic Project: Love and Soul – Terri Lyne Carrington (Concord, 2015)
- A Couple Friends* – Kindred the Family Soul featuring Valerie Simpson (Shanachie, 2014)
- Former Lady of Chic – Alfa Anderson (2013)
- It’s About Eve – Joan Jett (2002)
- Shocka Zooloo – T.M. Stevens (United One, 2001)
- Limousine Drive – T.M. Stevens (Victor, 2001)
- Radioactive – T.M. Stevens (Pidm, 1999)
- Take Action – The Intensity Quotient (Emergency, 1986)
- Sweepstakes – Nursery School (Epic, 1983)
- Daily Dose – Dizzy and the Romilars (Medical Records, 1982)
- TVC-15 – Dizzy and the Romilars (Medical Records, 1980)

== Film credits ==
- Bill Murray – A Very Murray Christmas (2015, Netflix) – percussionist
- Ashford & Simpson – The Real Thing Live DVD (2008, SONY) – keyboardist, vocalist

== Television appearances ==
- David Letterman – with Valerie Simpson – July 15, 2015
- CBS Morning Show – solo performance with NY firefighters – July 20, 2002
- Oprah Winfrey Show – with Ashford & Simpson and Maya Angelou – September 27, 1996
- Rosie O'Donnell Show – with Ashford & Simpson and Maya Angelou – November 6, 1996
- Club MTV Live – with Debbie Harry – November 6, 1996
- Pat Sajak Show – with Grayson Hugh – 1989
- Byron Allen Show – with Grayson Hugh – 1989
