= Valeriev =

- Gender: Male

Origin
- Origin: Latin nomen Valerius
- Region of origin: Italy

Valeriev is a Bulgarian surname. Notable people with the surname include:

- Svetoslav Valeriev (born 1988), Bulgarian footballer
- Tsvetomir Valeriev (born 1983), Bulgarian footballer
