= Valeriano Lunense =

- Frazione
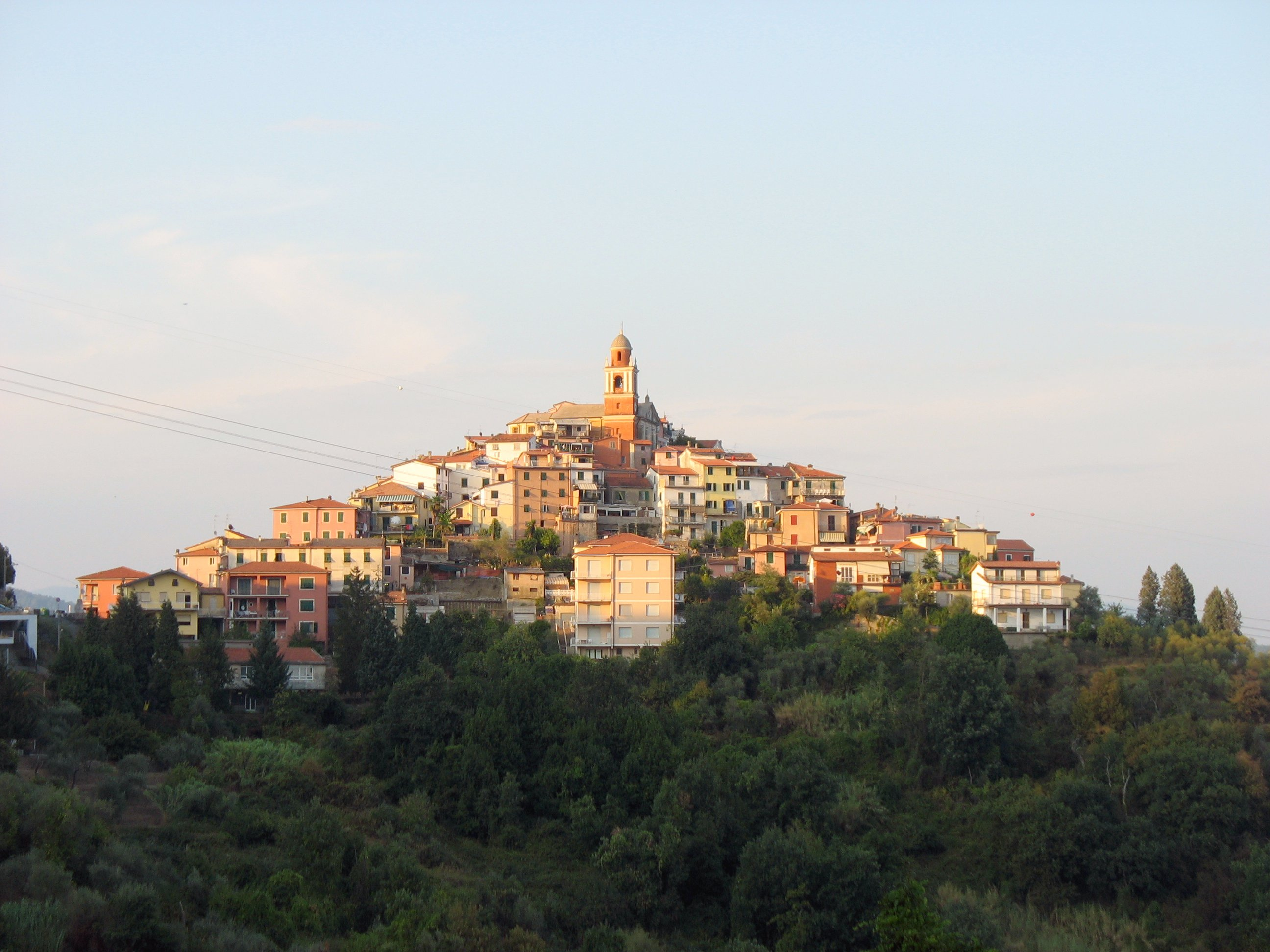

- Location of Valeriano Lunense in Italy
- Coordinates: 44°8′57″N 9°51′24″E
- Country: Italy
- Region: Liguria
- Province: La Spezia
- Comune: Vezzano Ligure
- Elevation: 271 m (889 ft)

Population (31-12-2010)
  - Total: 500
- Demonym: Valeranesi
- Time zone: UTC+1 (CET)
  - Summer (DST): UTC+2 (CEST)
- Postal code: 19020
- Dialing code: 0187

Valeriano Lunense is a village (frazione) of about 500 inhabitants in the comune of Vezzano Ligure in the province of La Spezia, Italy (Valeràn in the local language).

The town is a medieval village, overlooking the Gulf of the Poets and the Plain of Slim, and is visible from the castles of the Lunigiana.

== Monuments and places of interest ==
The planning of the village, at least in the most important elements, concerns the patterns found in Trebiano and especially Castelnuovo Magra, which predominate in sets of houses and streets with a straight line along the ridge of hills, from which stand the volume of the church and bell tower.

At the top of the village stand the ruins of an ancient castle, near rounded knolls, that recall the castles of the Ligurians, a people of shepherds and farmers jealous of their independence.

Parts of the castle are much older than the medieval period. According to historian Livy, 40,000 inhabitants of the Ligurian Apuan, and other 7,000 people in the Val di Magra and Vara, the Sannio, were the victims of the first deportation of history, by the consuls Cornelius Cethegus and Mario Bebio.

After the deportation, high-wealth families in Rome established their houses and properties along the coast of Luni, on Cordonata Caprione, and in the hills by Arcola Vezzano and Valerian, as recalled by Persio in his Satire.

The town's name derives from fundus Valerii or Fundum Valerianum, from one of these families who had possession of the hill for nearly a thousand years.

There are no documents in order to date the Romanization of Valerian. However, the Tabula Alimentaria, as emperor Trajan to Velleia, was founded two centuries ago and kept in the Museum National Parma, among many Velleia funds to contribute to the maintenance of poor children, many bearing the name of Valerian and their owners such as Publius Valerius Ligurino.

A document from June 10, 1033, the time of Conrad the Salic Emperor of the Holy Roman Empire, states that the family of the Marquis Adalberto Olbertenghi, race Lombard, makes donation to the monastery founded in Castiglione a portion of its assets and the "tenth" of its property located in the County of Valerian Luni.

Then Valerian was a stronghold of the Malaspina family and the bishops of Luni as reflected by the "decision" agreed the May 12, 1202 between the Bishop of Luni Gualtiero Marchesi and Albert William and Conrad Malaspina, which shall establish the terms of their domains, and the decree of May 31 published in 1202 1717 by the Masons in "Antiquities Este" at Modena.

The February 16, 1224 Valerian and Follo were made "in fellowship" from the Republic of Genoa. The two countries had to help and defend each other.

In the next hundred years, the country was subjected for some time to Podesta Carpena with Follo, Bastremoli and Tivegna, managing to preserve its rights and territory.

April 19, 1585 The Senate of the Republic of Genoa to Valeriano acknowledges the status of free town with its own statutes and rulers, who maintained even under foreign domination, both Austrian and French, until the nineteenth century which was absorbed in the administrative district of Vezzano Ligure.

On the night of January 26, 1945 the country and the third largest partisan "Amelio" shed their toll at the end of a raid which began on 20 with the main goal of the partisans and American paratroopers Gordon Lett, featured the 35° Black Brigade "Tullio Bertoni", the divisions Monterosa and Italy, together with Germanic troops.

=== Religious Architecture ===
Dedicated to San Apollinare, the church was blessed on July 23, 1703 and has a baptismal font in white marble cherubs, stucco altars and twisted columns in porphyry. It is enriched with a body of the manufacturer Serassi, assembled in loco in 1876 by Ferdinand (1858–1894), the last manufacturer of the family, and placed in the choir loft above the front door of the church.

The church is listed among the chapels dependent on the Church of San Prospero (Vezzano Ligure), in the tenth triennial decreed by Pope Boniface VIII for the 1295–98, 1298–1301 and 1301−04 sign that the church already enjoyed a certain autonomy, acting as a parish to the village.

The building is not listed in the medieval's age Estimi of Diocese of Luni of 1470−71, nor has survived the minutes of the pastoral visit made by the delegates of the Cardinal Benedict Lomellini in 1568.

In time, it was enlarged and embellished several times, and by the local confraternity of the Rosary and the SS. Sacramento two side altars were erected.

==== The organ ====
The organ has 21 pipes, 61-key keyboard with pedals pedals lectern 18. Requires restoration, and is size comparable to those of organs of churches much more important.

The company realized in the province of La Spezia Serassi organs still functioning to: Church of Santo Stefano (Marinasco) (1822), SS. John and Augustine (SP, 1823), the Church of San Martino (Bastremoli, 1832), Vezzano High (1832), Sanctuary of Our Lady of Mirteto (Ortonovo, 1834) and Church of San Lorenzo (1884), Church of Santa Maria Assunta Bolano, (1820), Cathedral of Santa Maria Assunta (Sarzana) (1842) and the Church of Our Lady of Mount Carmel.

The organ has a prospectus single-span wooden box and composite style, painted in gold. The front pipes are arranged in a pyramid aligned with mouths and lips over miter.

The cane plant is the main register C1 8 ° down, 61-key keyboard with a range of C1-DO6 and chromatic octave, 16-note pedalboard lectern C1-D # 2, soundboard master wind.

The organ is provided with two bellows positioned inside the enclosure, one lantern 125×225 cm, and a compensator wedge 80×210 cm.

Accessories over the second foot (above the main one): expression, tremolo, bass bassoon, clarinet, trumpet, banda, third hand, the tremolo pedal combination preparabile, tirapieno.

Registers n.32, arranged in two rows of 16 in the following order: bells of the keyboard, the main 16 low drone, the main 16 sopranos, English horn, principal 8 bassi, bassoon bass, Top 8 sopranos, trumpet 16 sopranos, octave bass, bass clarinet, eighth sopranos, trumpet, soprano, decimaquinta, clarinet, decimanona, cello, bass, fifteenth day, oboe, fifteenth day, Flautino sopranos, four stuffed, purple low, two filling Flautino low, two filling purple leg low harmonics, octave s., bombards, the human voice, trombones.

=== Military architecture ===
About 2 km away from the fort of Monte Albano, built in 1887 as a defense against the land front, and then used in first and World War II with a budget up to 38 guns, 120mm, as part of the network of stations in defense of the Gulf of the Poets.

== Infrastructure and transport ==
The village is reached by two roads:

- The national road 330 of Buonviaggio, a hamlet situated halfway between La Spezia and Sarzana, which, coming from railway station of La Spezia Migliarina, is located 2 km after hospital Felettino. Through the national road 330, moving in direction towards to Bottagna, Follo and Ceparana, it is possible to access the Autostrada A12 at Ceparana;
- A scenic route to the nearest part of the break Bottom of La Spezia, shortly after the Central Station, and through the villages of Sarbia, Felettino Island, Monte Albano and its strong, to go down and end in Valeriano Lunense.

Leaving the highway to La Spezia, at the mouth of a junction that rises up to meet up with the aforesaid road to Monte Albano, in the hills near the location of the headquarters of the University Centre. On the one hand, continue to Sarbia and Monte Albano, while in the opposite direction down towards the center of La Spezia.

The village is also accessible from Plan Follo, via a scenic route, in some parts unpaved, which crosses the hills and fields, and is mainly used for walking and sports activities.

The village is served by the 1 Gigabyte/second optical fiber of Open Fiber, by the Tim's ADSL 2, and Fixed Wireless Access and 5G of the main Italian mobile phone operators.

== Bibliography ==
- Valeriano, un angolo di Lunigiana fra fiumi e mare, Comune di Vezzano Ligure editore.
- Storia di Vezzano Ligure: dal Medioevo all'età giolittiana, Comune di Vezzano Ligure editore.

== See also ==
- Liguria
- Province of La Spezia
- Vezzano Ligure
- Cinque Terre
