= Valery Goryukhanov =

Russian politician

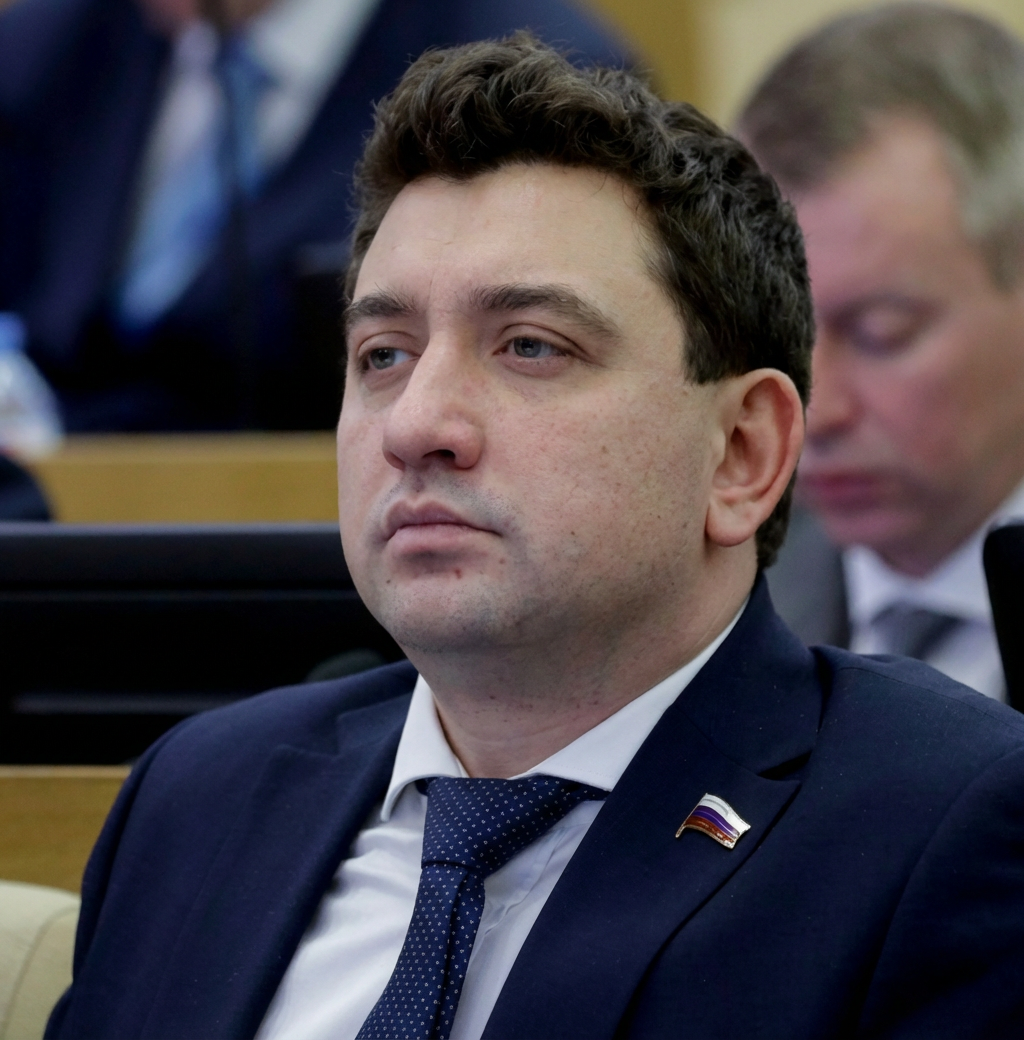

Member of the State Duma
- Incumbent
- Assumed office 24 December 2025
- Preceded by: Anatoly Voronovsky

Personal details
- Born: 5 September 1990 (age 35)
- Party: United Russia

Valery Anatolyevich Goryukhanov (born 5 September 1990) is a Russian politician who has been a member of the State Duma since 2025.

== See also ==
- 8th State Duma
