= Valerian Shalikashvili =

- Born: May 23, 1874; Aketi, Ozurgeti uezd, Caucasus Viceroyalty, Russian Empire
- Died: January 30, 1919 (aged 44); Aketi, Ozurgeti uezd, Democratic Republic of Georgia
- Occupations: Actor, director, playwright

Valerian "Valiko" Shalikashvili (Georgian: ვალერიან "ვალიკო" შალიკაშვილი) (1874–1919) was a Georgian producer, actor, and playwright. He played on the Russian theatre stage and was known for his ability to charm his audiences. He died at the age of 44.
