= Valerian Savelyev =

Russian footballer and coach

Personal information
- Full name: Valerian Borisovich Savelyev
- Date of birth: 22 October 1962 (age 64)
- Height: 1.80 m (5 ft 11 in)
- Position: Midfielder

Youth career
- FC Dynamo Moscow

Senior career*
Years	Team	Apps	(Gls)
1981	FC Dynamo Vologda	8	(0)
1982–1984	FC Dynamo Stavropol	71	(7)
1986–1987	FC Volzhanin Kineshma	45	(0)
1987–1991	FC Fakel Voronezh	151	(21)
1992	FC Volzhanin Kineshma	35	(3)
1992–1994	FC Lokomotiv Nizhny Novgorod	32	(0)

Managerial career
- 1995: FC Lokomotiv Nizhny Novgorod (administrator)
- 1996: FC Lokomotiv Nizhny Novgorod (assistant)
- 1997–1998: FC Dynamo Shatura
- 2000–2001: Svyatogor Academy Moscow
- 2002: FC Volgar-Gazprom Astrakhan (assistant)
- 2004: FC LUKoil Chelyabinsk (assistant)
- 2007: FC Dynamo Moscow (reserves assistant)
- 2008: FC Dynamo Moscow (academy)
- * Club domestic league appearances and goals

Valerian Borisovich Savelyev (Russian: Валериан Борисович Савельев; born 22 October 1962) is a Russian football coach and a former player.
