= Valeria (wife of Sulla) =

Wife of Sulla

- Spouse: Sulla
- Children: Cornelia Postuma
- Parents: Marcus Valerius Messalla Niger (father); Hortensia (mother)

Valeria or Valeria Messalla was the fifth wife of two-term consul and Roman dictator Lucius Cornelius Sulla.

== Biography ==
=== Early life ===
Valeria was the daughter of a man called Marcus Valerius Messalla and Hortensia. Her father was the grandson of the homonymous consul of 161 BC through a father of the same name. She also had a brother named Marcus Valerius Messalla Rufus who was consul in 53 BC.

Plutarch calls her a sister of the orator Quintus Hortensius, but this is a mistake, Plutarch probably confused her as his sister instead of niece (Hortensius' sister being Hortensia, Valeria's mother).

=== Marriages ===
An "alert young divorcee", as Ronald Syme writes, she attracted the notice of Sulla at the theatre. She and her cousin Marcus Valerius Messalla Niger were seated behind Sulla due to being relatives of a recently retired chief vestal named Caecilia Metella Balearica, which explains why she as a relatively unimportant woman was seated so close to the dictator. Apparently as she passed by him, she plucked out a part of his toga (likely a single thread) which he noticed and turned around to look at who had touched him, she then excused herself and explained that she had meant no harm and had only attempted to take a part of the piece as she had hoped that it would grant her some of Sulla's famous luck. He was seemingly amused by her explanation and charmed by her personality, they continued to exchange some words. Later on in the evening, he would apparently keep looking back at her and asked questions to his companions about who she was. He then learned that she was unmarried and the niece of Quintus Hortensius Hortalus, who was a son-in-law to one of Sullas major supporters. Her family was likely surprised but delighted by his interest in her and would have encouraged her to reciprocate it. It is likely that her cousin Marcus Valerius Messalla Niger who had accompanied her owed his status as pontifex to Sulla.

He married her towards the end of his life. When he retired from public life to a villa in southern Italy, she accompanied him. She was pregnant at the time of his death in 78 BC and had a daughter, Cornelia Postuma, some months later. It is possible that she was infected by the disease which killed her husband and died not much later after giving birth to Postuma.

== Bibliography ==
- Zmeskal, Klaus (2009). Adfinitas (in German). Vol. 1. Passau: Verlag Karl Stutz. ISBN 978-3-88849-304-1.
