= Walaric =

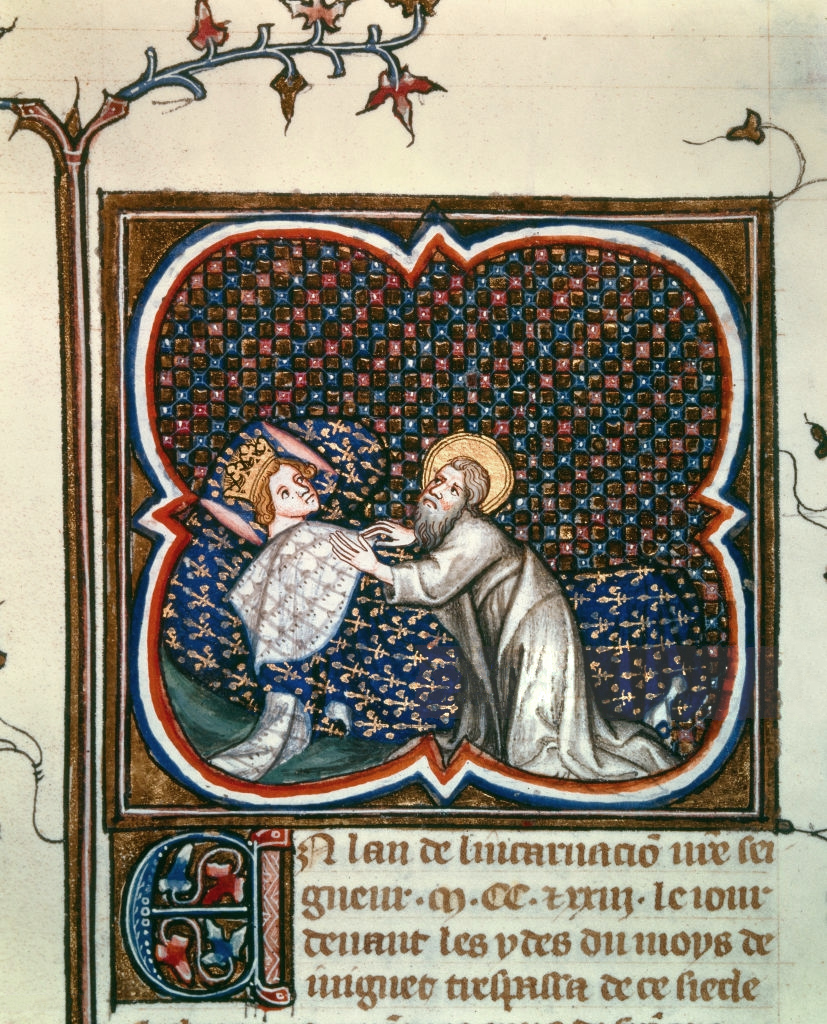
Walaric prophesying to Hugh Capet in a vision. From the 14th century Grandes Chroniques de France.

Saint Walaric, Valery in modern French, was a Christian monk born in 565 (d. 619 AD) and founder of the monastery of Leuconay, known today as Saint-Valery-sur-Somme. He was a follower of Columbanus, who founded monastic communities throughout Merovingian Gaul and continental Europe during the seventh century.

== Life (565-619 AD) ==
According to his Life written by Ragimbertus of Leuconay, Walaric was born in Auvergne to a peasant shepherd family around 565 AD. Walaric spent most of his childhood tending sheep and surrounded by nature, with old volcanic caves and circular crater lakes surrounding his homestead. As a child, Walaric possessed a brilliant mind and demonstrated a desire for learning. Dissatisfied with pastoralism, he pursued an education. Although local schools exclusively served to the children of nobility, Walaric approached an instructor and begged him to learn how to read and write. Walaric returned to care for his father’s flock, but he continued his studies and became well versed in the Psalter. He felt a spiritual calling and sought a life in the Church. Walaric went to the monastery of Autumo, where his maternal uncle lived as a monk, and chose to enter monastic life. His father objected and ordered his son to return home. Walaric refused, even though the entire community of brothers, including the abbot, urged him to obey his parents and assured him that he could come back one day. The monks stressed the difficulty of a monastic life, but Walaric, undeterred, would not leave. The abbot relented and Walaric was welcomed into the community. He was ordained a priest and took his vows, with his father in attendance, not long after.

His Life described Walaric as modest, sweet, gentle, and a fast learner.

Over the years, Walaric’s reputation as a holy man spread. He traveled to the monastery of Saint-Germain d’Auxerre where a noble man named Bobo came to Walaric and asked to follow his example. The two men then embarked on a pastoral mission and eventually reached the monastery of Luxeuil, which was founded by Saint Columbanus in 590. It was at Luxeuil that Walaric began to study under Columbanus, who previously had been exiled by King Theuderic II’s grandmother Brunhild. Columbanus became a mentor to Walaric, who embraced his teachings. While at Luxeuil, Walaric practiced horticulture, growing and preserving vegetables and fruit, and even found miraculous ways to exterminate the insects that would harm his crops, which impressed Columbanus.

Under Columbanus’ guidance, Walaric left Luxeuil and roamed the land, preaching and helping to found new monasteries in Gaul. Walaric, as a close disciple of Columbanus, played a significant role in the Irish monk’s evangelizing.

During his time in the abbey of Luxeuil, Saint Walaric met a man named Waldolenus, a prominent Luxovian monk. Waldelenus asked Columbanus for permission to leave the monastery and preach, and Walaric was permitted to accompany him. After a period of evangelizing in Neustria, Walaric retreated to a remote place at the mouth of the Somme to live as a hermit. He soon attracted disciples, and the monastery of Saint-Valery-sur-Somme was established on the site. At the time of the community’s foundation, Saint Walaric was an experienced monastic in his fifties. During the last days of Saint Walaric’s life, he spent most of his time on a little hill near Leuconany. It is said he spent his remaining days on that hill until on a Sunday, Saint Walaric died, his body resting on a tree. The exact year of Saint Walaric’s death is unknown, but it was probably around 619 AD.

Saint Walaric’s monastery in Luxeuil fell under the Rule of Columbanus rather than the Benedictine Rule, which had appeared around the same time. Though the Rule of Columbanus historically has been difficult to characterize, its spread greatly influenced the Christianization of continental Europe. Although the Rule of Columbanus emphasized humility and poverty, Columbanus took advantage of royal patronage and court politics to found monasteries across Gaul and into northern Italy. The Rule of Columbanus was more of a guide to monastic life than a rule, which outlined a penitential system that depended on strict obedience and rigid asceticism. Columbanus’ message resonated with kings and queens, but also those with more modest upbringings such as Walaric.

== Valerian Prophecy ==
Much of the historical impact of Saint Walaric was posthumous, occurring several centuries after his death. The Capetian dynasty based their legitimacy on a vision of Walaric that appeared to Hugh Capet in tenth-century France during the transition from the Carolingian Dynasty in Western Francia to the Capetian Dynasty. After King Louis V died without an heir, the throne passed to Hugh Capet, the founder of the Capetian Dynasty. John Baldwin states that the so-called Valerian Prophecy was a response to an eleventh-century accusation that the Capetians were usurpers. According to the prophecy, Hugh Capet received a vision of Saint Walaric who, out of gratitude for rescuing his remains from the Carolingians, assured the king that the Capetian Dynasty would rule for seven generations, seven being a number commonly tied to eternity or perfection. The Capetians reigned until the fourteenth century.

== England and Normandy ==
Orderic Vitalis (1075-1142 AD), a monk of Saint-Evroul in Normandy, mentions Saint Walaric in his Historia Ecclesiastica. Orderic expanded on a story first recorded by William of Jumieges, a contemporary of William the Conqueror who was present at the crossing of the English Channel preceding the Norman Conquest in 1066. Orderic wrote that the relics of Saint Walaric were specifically venerated to ensure safe passage across the English channel before William invaded England. William’s ships enjoyed favorable wind across the channel, and William’s invasion ultimately led to his victory and ascension to the English throne. Consequently, Walaric became the patron saint of sailors. His relics were once even transferred from Saint-Valery-sur-Somme to Saint-Valery-en-Caux in Normandy and later returned to Saint-Valery-sur-Somme in 1793.
