= Valene =

- Gender: Female

Origin
- Origin: Latin nomen Valentinus
- Region of origin: Italy

Valene may refer to:

- Valene Kane, Northern Irish actress
- Valene Maharaj (born 1986) was the Miss Trinidad and Tobago World 2007 title holder, and Miss World of the Caribbean for 2007
- Valene Ewing, fictional character in the CBS primetime soap operas Knots Landing and Dallas
