= Anesius =

Christian martyr

Saint Anesius
- Died: Probably Scillium, Africa Proconsularis, Roman Empire
- Honored in: Eastern Orthodox Church, Roman Catholic Church
- Canonized: Pre-Congregation

Anesius is one of several Christian martyrs in Africa commemorated as saints on March 31. The Martyrologium Romanum mentions Anesius, Theodulus, and Cornelia. All mentioned saints were canonized pre-congregation. Other sources, including Commentarium Historicum ad Universum Romanum Martyrologium, includes other names including Felix, Portus, Abdas (or Abda), and Valeria.

== See also ==
- Scillitan Martyrs

== Sources ==
- Holweck, F. G. A Biographical Dictionary of the Saints. St. Louis, MO: B. Herder Book Co., 1924.
