= Valerianus (name) =

- Gender: Male

Origin
- Origin: Latin nomen Valerius
- Region of origin: Italy

Valerianus or Valerian the Elder was Roman Emperor from 253 AD to 260 AD.

Valerianus is a name also held by:

- Valerian II (Publius Licinius Cornelius Valerianus; died 258), Roman Caesar, son of Emperor Gallienus and grandson of Emperor Valerian
- Valerianus Minor (died 268), son of the emperor Valerian
- Marius Valerianus (3rd century), Roman governor of Britannia Inferior
- Valerianus, Archbishop of Aquileia (369-388)
- Valerianus, a bishop of the Ancient Diocese of Auxerre
- Priscus Valerianus (fl. c. 450-456), Roman praetorian prefect
- Valerianus Magnus (1586–1661), Italian Capuchin missionary preacher in central Europe

== See also ==
- Valer (disambiguation)
- Valera (disambiguation)
- Valeria (gens)
- Valeria (given name)
- Valerian (name)
- Valeriano
- Valerie (given name)
- Valérien (disambiguation)
- Valerius (name)
