= Valerii (name) =

Valerius
- Gender: Male

Origin
- Origin: Latin nomen Valeria
- Region of origin: Italy

Valerii redirects to Valeria (gens), a patrician family at Rome, prominent from the very beginning of the Republic to the latest period of the Empire.

It may refer to:

- Valerius, ancient Roman family

Given name

- Valerii Kichin (born 1992), Kyrgyzstani footballer
- Valerii Zaluzhnyi, chief of Ukraine's armed forces

Surname

- Tonino Valerii (born 1934), Italian film director
