= Valera (disambiguation) =

Valera is a city in Venezuela.

Valera may also refer to:

== Places ==
- Valera District, Peru
- Valera, Texas, United States, an unincorporated community
- Valera Municipality, Venezuela
- Valera (crater), a tiny crater on the Moon

== People with the surname ==
- Alex Valera (born 1996), Peruvian footballer
- Álvaro Valera (born 1986), Spanish Paralympic table tennis player
- Blas Valera (1544–1597), Roman Catholic Jesuit priest, historian and linguist, one of the first mestizo priests in Peru
- Breyvic Valera (born 1992), Venezuelan baseball player
- Diego Soto Valera (died 1549), Spanish Roman Catholic prelate and Bishop of Mondoñedo
- Dominic Valera (born 1948), Filipino politician
- Dominique Valera (born 1947), French kickboxer and karateka
- Felix Valera (born 1988), Dominican boxer, WBA interim light-heavyweight champion from 2015 to 2016
- Germán Valera (born 2002), Spanish footballer
- John Valera, American politician from New Hampshire
- Juan Valera (footballer) (born 1984), Spanish footballer
- Juan Valera y Alcalá-Galiano (1824–1905), Spanish author, diplomat and government minister
- Julio Valera (born 1968), Puerto Rican retired Major League Baseball pitcher
- Lorenzo Coullaut Valera (1876–1932), Spanish sculptor
- Lourdes Valera (1963–2012), Venezuelan actress
- Marcela Valera (born 1987), Mexican footballer
- Mariano Valera (1770–?), Novohispanic officer, colonial official and briefly interim governor of the Spanish colony of Texas
- Mark Valera (born 1979), Australian murderer
- Naddazza Valera (born 1987), Cuban team handball player
- Ramón Valera (1912–1972), Filipino-American fashion designer
- Rey Valera (born 1954), Filipino singer, songwriter, music director, film scorer and television host
- Roberto Valera (born 1938), Cuban composer and pedagogue
- Rodman Valera (born 1982), Venezuelan volleyball player
- Selene Valera (born 1994), Mexican footballer
- Victor Valera (1927–2013), Venezuelan sculptor
- La Valera, a Spanish dancer of the early twentieth century

== Other uses ==
- Daihatsu Valéra, name of the Diahatsu Charade supermini car in the Netherlands

== See also ==
- De Valera (surname)
- Valeria (disambiguation)
- Valerie (disambiguation)
- Valérien (disambiguation)
