= Valérien =

Valérien may refer to:

- Fort Mont-Valérien, a fortress
- Harry Valérien (1923-2012), German sports journalist and television presenter
- Valérien Ismaël (born 1975), French footballer

== See also ==
- Valeri (name)
- Valerian (disambiguation)
- Valeriano, a name
- Valerianus (disambiguation)
- Valerie (disambiguation)
- Valery, a name
