= Valentina (given name) =

- Pronunciation: Russian: [vəlʲɪnʲˈtʲinə] Italian: [valenˈtiːna]
- Gender: Female

Origin
- Origin: Latin nomen Valentinus
- Meaning: healthy, strong

Other names
- Related names: Valentinus, Valentin, Valentine

Valentina is a feminine given name. It is a feminine form of the Roman name Valentinus, which is derived from the Latin word "valens" meaning "healthy, strong".

It is used in Italian, Greek, Russian, Ukrainian, Belarusian, Serbian, Croatian, Macedonian, Slovene, Romanian, Bulgarian, Portuguese and Spanish languages. It is a name particularly popular for Hispanic girls.

People named Valentina include:

- Valentina Acosta (born 1982), Colombian actress
- Valentina Ananina (born 1933), Soviet actress
- Valentina de Angelis (born 1989), American actress
- Valentina Aniballi (born 1984), Italian discus thrower
- Valentina Aracil (born 1966), Argentine retired swimmer
- Valentina Arrighetti (born 1985), Italian volleyball player
- Valentina Artamonova (born 1960), Russian politician
- Valentina Ramírez Avitia (1893–1979), Mexican revolutionary and soldadera
- Valentina Babor (born 1989), German classical pianist
- Valentina Barron (born 1993), Australian actress
- Valentina Bassi (born 1972), Argentine actress
- Valentina Bastianelli (born 1987), Italian cyclist
- Valentina Battler (born 1946), Russian poet
- Valentina Bellè (born 1992), Italian actress
- Valentina Belotti (born 1980), Italian mountain runner
- Valentina Bergamaschi (born 1997), Italian footballer
- Valentina Blažević (born 1994), Croatian handball player
- Valentina Bonariva (born 1989), Italian dancer
- Valentina Boni (born 1983), Italian footballer
- Valentina Braconi (born 1990), Italian field hockey player
- Valentina Bronevich (born 1956), Russian politician
- Valentina Cámara (born 1993), Argentine footballer
- Valentina Caniglia, American cinematographer
- Valentina Carnelutti (born 1973), Italian actress
- Valentina Carretta (born 1989), Italian cyclist
- Valentina Cenni (born 1982), Italian artist and actress
- Valentina Centeno (born 1997), Ecuadorian lawyer and politician
- Valentina Cernoia (born 1991), Italian footballer
- Valentina Cervi, Italian actress
- Valentina Chebotareva (born 1960), Russian figure skating coach
- Valentina Chepiga (born 1962), Ukrainian IFBB professional bodybuilder
- Valentina Cortese (1923–2019), Italian film actress
- Valentina Costa Biondi (born 1995), Argentine field hockey player
- Valentina Crespi (1892–after 1959), Italian-American violinist
- Valentina Cuppi (born 1983), Italian politician
- Valentina Cușnir (born 1954), Moldovan politician
- Valentina De Poli (born 1968), Italian journalist
- Valentina Díaz (born 2001), Chilean footballer
- Valentina Dimitrieva (1937–2019), Russian farm worker
- Valentina Dorofeeva (1937–2018), Soviet industrialist
- Valentina D'Urbano (born 1983), Italian writer
- Valentina Domenig-Ozimic (born 2005), Austrian rhythmic gymnast
- Valentina Espinosa (born 1998), Colombian model and beauty pageant titleholder
- Valentina Favazza (born 1987), Italian voice actress
- Valentina Ferrer (born 1993), Argentine model
- Valentina Borisovna Grekova (1931–2019), Soviet Russian building and art restorer
- Valentina Grizodubova (1909–1993), Soviet aviator
- Valentina Martínez Ferro (born 1976), Spanish politician
- Valentina Figuera (born 2000), Venezuelan model
- Valentina Fiorin (born 1984), Italian volleyball player
- Valentina Fluchaire (born 1994), Mexican transgender model and beauty queen
- Valentina Gaganova (1932–2010), Russian textile worker and politician
- Valentina Gardellin (born 1970), Italian basketball player
- Valentina Ivanovna Gagarina (1935–2020), wife of the first cosmonaut Yuri Gagarin.
- Valentina L. Garza, Cuban writer
- Valentina Georgieva (born 2006), Bulgarian artistic gymnast
- Valentina Gestro de Pozzo (1914–2011), Argentine reporter
- Valentina Giacinti (born 1994), Italian footballer
- Valentina Giovagnini (1980–2009), Italian singer
- Valentina Acosta Giraldo (born 2000), Colombian archer
- Valentina Golubenko (born 1990), Russian-born chess player playing for Estonia and Croatia
- Valentina Gorbachuk (born 1937), Soviet and Ukrainian mathematician
- Valentina Gorinevskaya (1882–1953), Russian military surgeon
- Valentina Grizodubova (1909–1993), Soviet pilot
- Valentina Gunina (born 1989), Russian chess grandmaster
- Valentina Höll (born 2001), Austrian cyclist
- Valentina Igoshina (born 1978), Russian pianist
- Valentina Ivakhnenko (born 1993), Russian tennis player
- Valentina Ivashova (1915–1991), Soviet actress
- Valentina Kevliyan (born 1978), Bulgarian gymnast
- Valentina Khmel (born 1939), Russian painter-plasterer and politician
- Valentina Kobe (1905–1998), Slovenian academic and anatomist
- Valentina Kogan (born 1980), Argentine handball player
- Valentina Kozlova (born 1957), Soviet-born Russian American ballerina
- Valentina Kulagina (1902–1987), Russian artist
- Valentina Legkostupova (1965–2020), Russian singer
- Valentina Leskaj (born 1948), Albanian politician and political economist
- Valentina Linkova (born 1970), Russian winter archery biathlete and run archer
- Valentina Lisitsa (born 1973), Ukrainian pianist
- Valentina Lituyeva (1930–2008), Soviet track and field athlete
- Valentina Lodovini (born 1978), Italian actress
- Valentina Malyavina (1941–2021), Russian actress
- Valentina Marcucci (born 1998), Argentine field hockey player
- Valentina Marocchi (born 1983), Italian diver
- Valentina Massi (born 1983), Italian pageant winner
- Valentina Matos (born 2000), Spanish figure skater
- Valentina Matviyenko (born 1949), Russian politician
- Valentina Maureira (2000/01–2015), Chilean teen
- Valentina Metaj (born 2004), Kosovan footballer
- Elizabeth Miklosi aka Valentina (born 1983), American professional wrestler
- Valentina Miranda (born 2000), Chilean activist and politician
- Valentina Moncada (born 1959), Italian historian
- Valentina Monetta (born 1975), Sammarinese singer
- Valentina Mora (born 1997), Colombian model and beauty pageant titleholder
- Valentina Moscatt (born 1987), Italian judoka
- Valentina Naforniță (born 1987), Moldovan soprano
- Valentina Nappi (born 1990), Italian pornographic film actress
- Valentina Parshina (1937–2020), Russian and Soviet agronomist and politician
- Valentina Pedicini (1978–2020), Italian screenwriter and film director
- Valentina Petrillo (born 1973), Italian Paralympic athlete
- Valentina Pivnenko (born 1947), Russian politician
- Valentina Polkhanova (born 1971), Russian cyclist
- Valentina Ponomaryova (singer) (born 1939), Russian singer
- Valentina Ponomaryova (1933–2023), Soviet cosmonaut
- Valentina Quintero (born 1954), Venezuelan journalist, environmental activist, radio and television hostess.
- Valentina Quiroga (born 1982), Chilean civil engineer and politician
- Valentina Radinska (born 1951), Bulgarian poet
- Valentina Raposo (born 2003), Argentine field hockey player
- Valentina Rodini (born 1995), Italian rower
- Valentina Romani (born 1996), Italian actress
- Valentina Romeo (born 1977), Italian cartoonist, illustrator, billiards player
- Valentina Rubtsova (born 1977), Ukrainian-born Russian actress and singer
- Valentina Ruiz Lizárraga, Mexican politician
- Valentina Ryser (born 2001), Swiss tennis player
- Valentina Safronova (1918–1943), Hero of the Soviet Union
- Valentina Sampaio (born 1996), Brazilian actress
- Valentina Sanina-Schlee (1899–1989), Russian-American fashion designer
- Valentina Sanseverino (born 1999), know professionally as Vale LP, Italian singer-songwriter and rapper
- Valentina Sassi (born 1980), Italian tennis coach
- Valentina Scandolara (born 1990), Italian bicycler
- Valentina Serena (born 1981), Italian volleyball player
- Valentina Serova (1917–1975), Soviet actress
- Valentina Shevchenko (born 1988), Russian-Peruvian kickboxer and mixed martial artist
- Valentina Stupina (1920–1943), Soviet pilot
- Valentina Sturza (born 1929), Moldovan activist
- Valentina Sulpizio (born 1984), Italian tennis player
- Valentina Talyzina (born 1935), Soviet actress
- Valentina Tăzlăuanu (1950–2020), Moldovan essayist, journalist, and theatre critic
- Valentina Terekhova, Russian rower
- Valentina Tereshkova (born 1937), Soviet cosmonaut and first woman in space
- Valentina Titova (born 1942), Russian actress
- Valentina Tolkunova (1946–2010), Soviet singer
- Valentina Tronel (born 2009), French child singer
- Valentina Turchetto (born 1999), know professionally as Mew, Italian singer-songwriter
- Valentina Turisini (born 1969), Italian sports shooter
- Valentina Uccheddu (born 1966), Italian long jumper
- Valentina Vargas (born 1964), Chilean actress
- Valentina Vezzali (born 1974), Italian fencer
- Valentina Lizana Wallner (born 1990), Swedish ice hockey player and coach
- Valentina Yegorova (born 1964), Russian long-distance runner
- Valentina Yermolova (1940–2023), Soviet-Ukrainian writer and screenwriter
- Valentina Zenere (born 1997), Argentine actress
- Valentina Zelyaeva (born 1982), Russian-American supermodel
- Valentina Zhuravlyova (1933–2004), Russian writer
- Valentina and others, Christian martyrs in Palestine c. 308 AD
- Claudia Valentina (born 2001), British singer and songwriter
- Giovanni Valentina (born 1975), Brazilian rower

== See also ==
- Valentina (disambiguation)
