= Grekov =

Grekov (Russian: Греков), or the feminine version Grekova (Russian: Грекова), are surnames common in Russia, Belarus, and Bulgaria, and may refer to:

== People with the surname Grekov ==
- Boris Grekov (1882–1953), Soviet historian
- Dimitar Grekov (1847–1901), Bulgarian politician
- Mitrofan Grekov (1882–1934), Soviet painter
- Trifon Grekov (1893–1973), Macedonian physician
- Valentyn Grekov (born 1976), Ukrainian judoka
- Yury Grekov (1943–2024), Russian army officer

== People with the surname Grekova ==
- Irina Grekova (1907–2002), Russian writer and mathematician
- Nadezhda Grekova (1910–2001), Soviet Belarusian politician
- Valentina Borisovna Grekova (1931–2019) Soviet Russian art and building restorer
- Emily Zamourka (née Liudmila Grekova; born c. 1967) Moldovan and American singer
