= Flag of the Internal Macedonian Revolutionary Organization =

IMRO
- Use: Civil flag
- Proportion: 1:2
- Adopted: 1920s
- Design: A horizontal bicolour of red and black

The official flag of the Internal Macedonian Revolutionary Organization was adopted in the early 1920s by the Central Committee of IMRO. In 1922, an article was issued by the member of the Macedonian Federative Organization Trifon Grekov entitled "The Flag of Independent Macedonia". It was published in the Bulgarian newspaper "Autonomous Macedonia", and proposed this flag to become the flag of the future Independent Macedonia. The flag was also the state flag of the proposed puppet state: Independent State of Macedonia. Today the flag is used by right wing political parties in North Macedonia like VMRO-DPMNE and also Bulgarian political parties like VMRO-BND.

== See also ==
- Flags of Internal Macedonian-Adrianople Revolutionary Organization
- Flag of Nicaragua, whose Rojinegra variant resembles the IMRO flag.
- Flag of the Ukrainian Insurgent Army
