= Crespi =

Crespi (the Italian form of "Crispus") is a surname. Notable people with the surname include:

- Benedetto Crespi (died 725 AD), archbishop of Milan
- Consuelo Crespi (1928–2010), model and editor of Vogue Italia
- Cristoforo Benigno Crespi (1833–1920), Italian entrepreneur who founded the factory and village of Crespi d’Adda
- Daniele Crespi (1590–1630), Italian painter
- Domenico Passignano (born Cresti or Crespi) (1559–1636), Italian painter
- Frank Angelo Joseph "Creepy" Crespi (1918–1990), American baseball player
- Giovanni Battista Crespi called Il Cerano (1573–1632), Italian painter, sculptor, and architect
- Giulia Maria Crespi (1923–2020), Italian media proprietor
- Giuseppe Maria Crespi, called Lo Spagnuolo (1665–1747), Bolognese genre painter of the Baroque period
- Juan Crespí (1721–1782), Spanish missionary and explorer in California
- Martí Crespí (born 1987), Spanish footballer
- Valentina Crespi (born 1892), Italian-American violinist

Fictional characters:

- Martina Crespi, character from the anime/manga Strike Witches
- Pietro Crespi, character from the novel One Hundred Years of Solitude

== See also ==
- Crespi d’Adda, a workers’ village on the river Adda between Milan and Bergamo
- Crespi Carmelite High School, an all-male Catholic high school in Encino, California

== See also ==
- Crispus (disambiguation)
