= Crispus (disambiguation) =

Crispus was a Caesar of the Roman Empire.

Crispus may also refer to:

- Gaius Sallustius Crispus, generally known simply as Sallust (86 BC-c. 35 BC), Roman historian and politician
- Lucius Junius Quintus Vibius Crispus, 1st century Roman politician and wit
- Crispus of Chalcedon, 1st century Christian martyr and bishop of Chalcedon
- Crispus Attucks, (c. 1723–1770), the first of five people killed in the Boston Massacre
- Crispus Kiyonga (born 1952), Ugandan Minister of Defence and physician
- Crispus Allen, a DC Comics character

== See also ==
- Crespi
