= Flag of the Ukrainian Insurgent Army =

Ukrainian nationalist flag

- Use: Other
- Proportion: 2∶3
- Adopted: April 1941 (by the Organization of Ukrainian Nationalists, Banderite faction)
- Design: A horizontal bicolour of black and red

The flag of the Ukrainian Insurgent Army (Ukrainian: Прапор УПА, romanized: Prapor UPA), also known as the red-and-black flag (Ukrainian: Червоно-чорний прапор, romanized: Chervono-chornyi prapor), or Banderite flag, is a flag previously used by the Ukrainian Insurgent Army (UPA) and the Banderite faction of the Organization of Ukrainian Nationalists (OUN-B). The flag is now used by various Ukrainian nationalist organizations and parties, including UNA-UNSO, Right Sector, Congress of Ukrainian Nationalists and others.

The flag was designed by the OUN-B for the red and black colors to represent blood and soil and was influenced by Nazi Germany's use of the concept. The perception of the flag in Ukraine has shifted over time in response to the 2014 Russian invasion and it is frequently used today as an unofficial war flag. In Poland, the flag is instead widely associated with the massacres of Poles in Volhynia and Eastern Galicia conducted by the UPA, and display of the red-and-black flag in Poland can result in police action as it may be associated with "the public promotion of fascism or another totalitarian system".

== History ==
=== Design ===
The flag was designed by the Banderite faction of the Organization of Ukrainian Nationalists (OUN-B), which sought to develop its own symbolism in order to differ from the Andriy Melnyk faction of the OUN (OUN-M), which used a blue flag and the coat of arms with a golden trident (tryzub) with a sword.

The colours red and black were chosen to represent the ideology of "blood and soil" and was influenced by the Nazi party's use of the concept.

The OUN-B adopted a red and black emblem, and at the II Great Gathering of the OUN in April 1941 decided to abandon the trident with a sword and use only "the national Trident of Volodymyr the Great in the form introduced by the Central Rada" and "a separate organizational flag of black and red colors. The way of life and the mandatory proportions will be adopted by a separate commission." However, due to the outbreak of World War II, this commission never met.

==== Prior uses of red and black in Ukrainian history ====
Exceprt of Ilya Repin's 19th century painting Reply of the Zaporozhian Cossacks showing blue-yellow and red-black colour patterns

Andriy Grechylo states that the red-black color scheme heralds back to the Zaporozhian Cossacks, evidenced by the 1880-1891 painting Reply of the Zaporozhian Cossacks by Ilya Repin, where it can be seen next to the blue-and-yellow draped spear.

The 1914-1917 Ukrainian Sich Riflemen (USS) embroidered the color scheme on their uniforms and banners and it was also used by the Knights of the Iron Spur, a chivalric order set up by USS officers in autumn 1916.

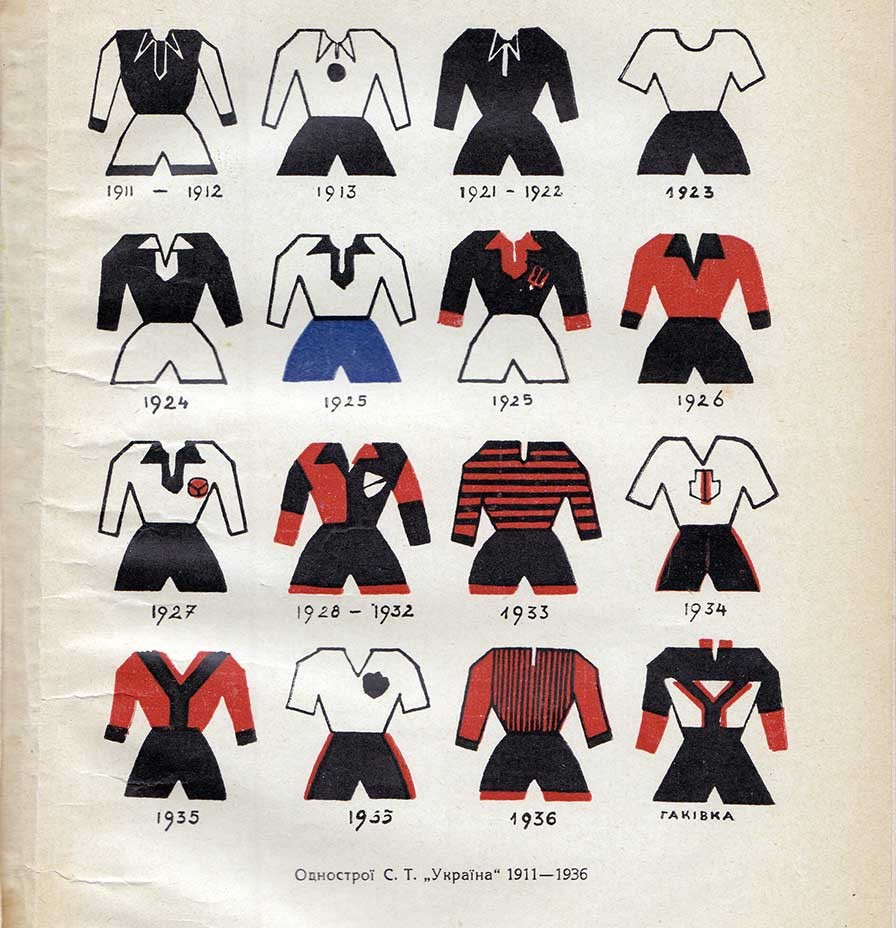
Ukraina Lwów used black and red as national colors for hockey and football teams

The colors were adopted by the Plast kurins Forest Devils (Lisovi Chorty) in 1922 and the Order of the Iron Spur, revived in 1927. The sports society "Ukraine" used the colors in the 1920s and 1930s in its emblem and kit.

=== Later uses ===
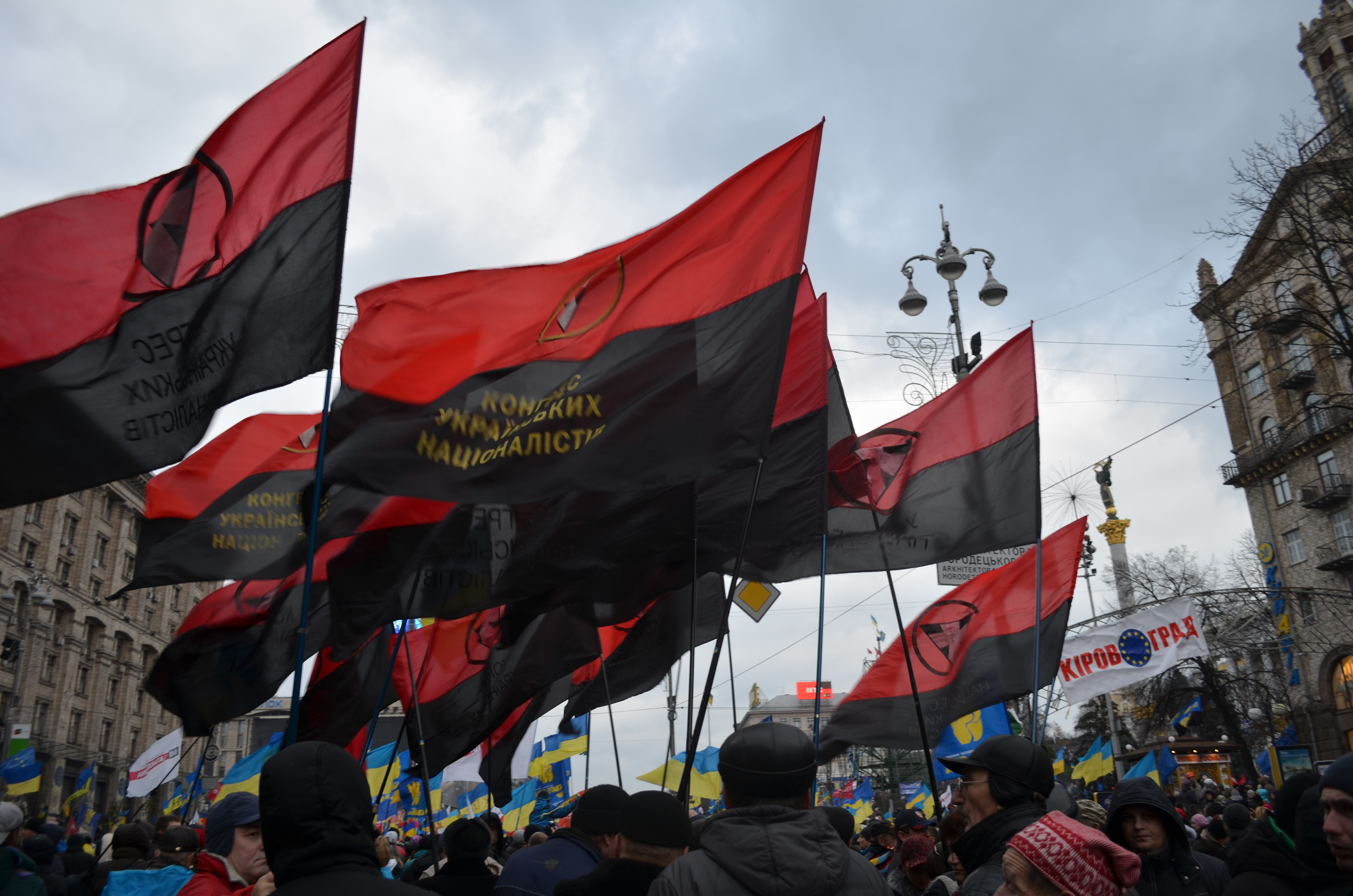
Red-and-black flags at the Euromaidan protests, 2013.

The flag received a lot of usage after the Independence of Ukraine in 1991, where it became a common symbol of Ukrainian nationalists. The flag remained controversial as being associated with the UPA and Right Sector. It has also been frequently used as a military symbol and unofficial war flag during the Russo-Ukrainian War.

On 30 March 2018, the Verkhovna Rada of Ukraine registered a bill "On the Flag of National Dignity", which provides for the installation of the red-and-black flag on government buildings, schools, institutes, enterprises nine times a year during the celebration of certain memorable dates in order to honor "heroes who made a significant contribution to the struggle for independence of Ukraine". This bill also provides for the technical justification and rules for the installation of the flag.

According to Serhy Yekelchyk, the image of Stepan Bandera acquired a new meaning in the course of the Revolution of Dignity as a symbol of resistance to the corrupt Russian-sponsored regime, set apart from the historical role of Bandera as a supporter of ethnonationalism— this symbolism as it relates to the red-and-black flag was further strengthened when Right Sector formed military units that fought in Eastern Ukraine. Andrii Portnov argues that this was facilitated by a rejection of Russia's portrayal of Ukrainians as 'fascists' and 'Banderites' and a general lack of knowledge about the activity of the UPA. The red-and-black flag was heavily promoted by Svoboda at the local level where the party was more successful— in Central Ukraine, it was referred to as the "flag of the struggle" rather than the more controversial "flag of the OUN".

According to Jars Balan, the red-and-black flag has been used since the Russian invasion of Ukraine by those who want to identify with the tradition of militant Ukrainian nationalism and who "respect the fact that the OUN and UPA took up arms in the struggle for Ukrainian independence".

Historians Andreas Umland and Yuliya Yurchuk write that "In the new post-revolutionary political context, older symbols of 20th-century Ukrainian nationalism acquired new meaning as the ongoing fight against Russian aggression made some aspects of the OUN-UPA legacy more acceptable for Ukrainian society at large."

== Controversies ==
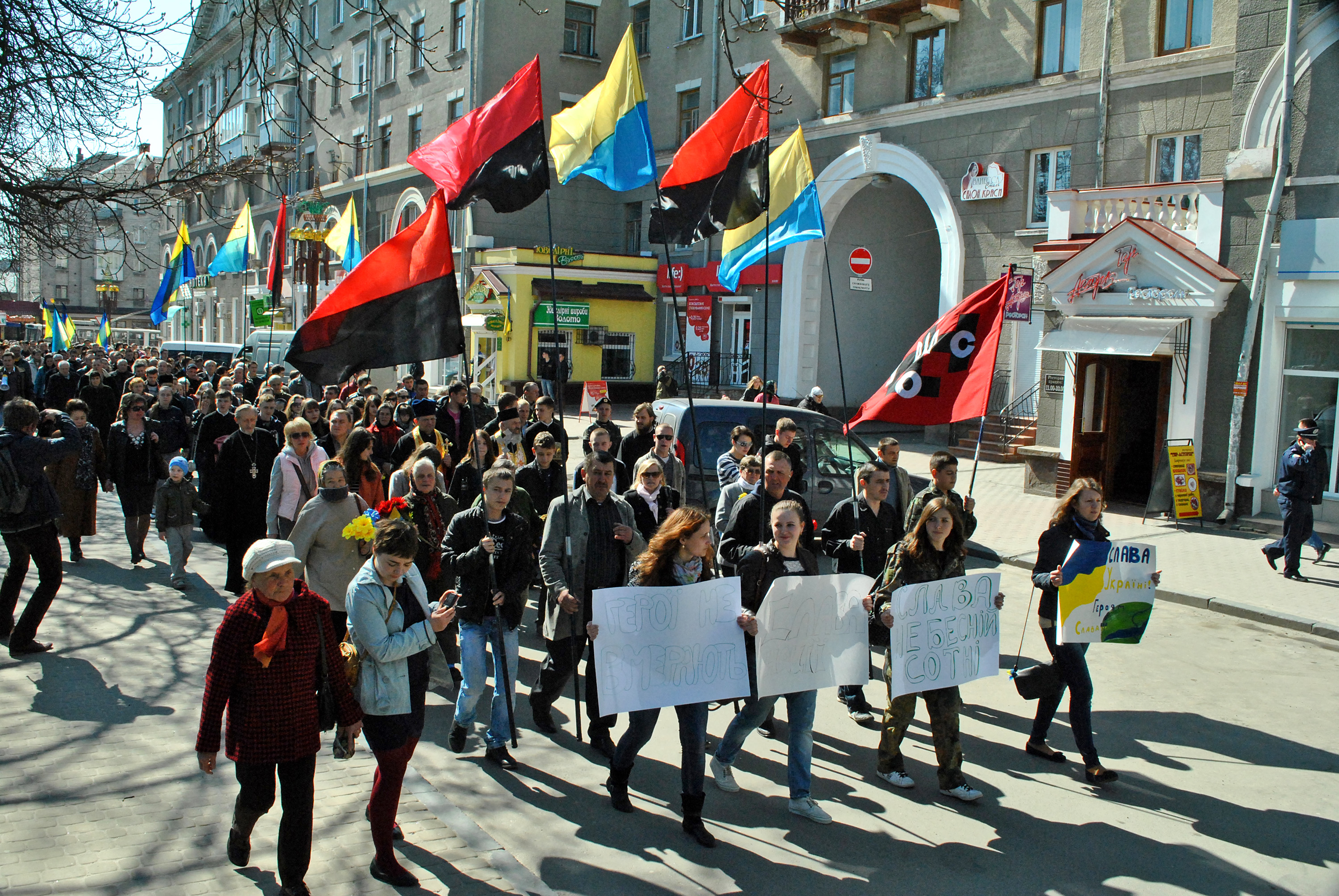
Activists of the Ukrainian nationalist party Right Sector fly the red-and-black flags together with the flag of UNA-UNSO and the flag of Ukraine.

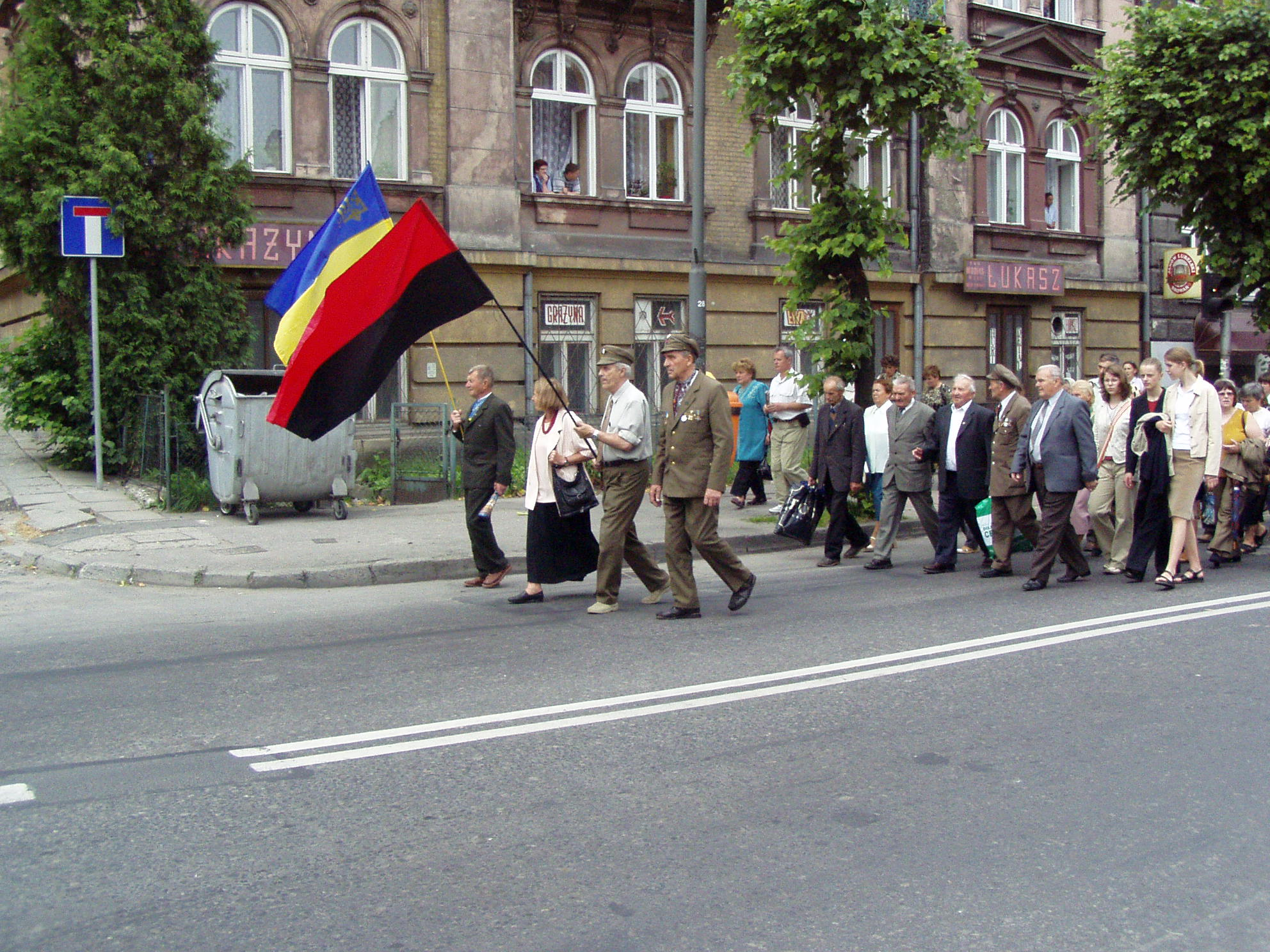
Veterans of the Ukrainian Insurgent Army (UPA) marching in Przemyśl, Poland.

In Poland, the red-and-black flag is widely associated with the massacres of Poles in Volhynia and Eastern Galicia committed by the UPA.

The massacres were cited to justify Operation Vistula in the propaganda of the Polish People's Republic and continue to be the focus of memory politics in contemporary Poland, largely driven by right-wing groups and politicians. In 2013, the Polish Senate passed a resolution that described the massacres as "ethnic cleansing with the features of a genocide". According to Grzegorz Motyka, there has been a "growing radicalism" in Polish views on Polish–Ukrainian relations with the massacres often portrayed as a "third genocide" sometimes surpassing those committed by the Nazis and Communists.

In August 2025, President Karol Nawrocki proposed legislation that would ban "Banderite symbols", including the red-and-black flag, on par with Nazi and Soviet Communist emblems.

The display of the red-and-black flag in Poland can result in police action as it may be associated with "the public promotion of fascism or another totalitarian system", which is forbidden by Article 256 of the Polish Penal Code. For that reason, Polish police searched for individuals accused of painting it on building facades in Wrocław in 2024. In the same city, police also questioned individuals who displayed the flag on a balcony in 2022.

In December 2024, Polish Defense Minister Władysław Kosiniak-Kamysz, intervened with the Ukrainian attaché in Warsaw over flags displayed on Polish-donated Rosomak armored vehicles. Roman Ponomarenko, an officer of the 12th Azov Brigade commented on the matter, stating it was "an exploitation of historical conflict and narrative for the sake of cheap popularity".

In August 2025, during a concert by rapper Max Korzh at Warsaw's National Stadium, violence broke out. One of the attendees brandished a black-and-red flag. Over 100 people were detained by the police, and proceedings to expel 63 of them were initiated.

On 7 July 2026, MEP Ewa Zajączkowska-Hernik (PfE) took part in the debate in European Parliament over "2025 Commission report on Ukraine" in which she stated that "There is no moral difference between honoring the SS and honoring the UPA" and tore up the red–and–black UPA flag on the podium.

== See also ==
- Flag of the Internal Macedonian Revolutionary Organization, same colors
- Flag of Nicaragua, whose Rojinegra variant is nearly identical to the UIA flag

== Bibliography ==
- Bruder, Franziska (2007). „Den ukrainischen Staat erkämpfen oder sterben!“ Die Organisation ukrainischer Nationalisten (OUN) 1929–1948 ["Fight for the Ukrainian State or Die!" The Organisation of Ukrainian Nationalists (OUN) 1929–1948] (in German). Berlin: Metropol Verlag.
- Glew, Anna (2021). "Commemoration in the midst of the ongoing Russia-Ukraine conflict". British Journal for Military History. 7 (2): 148–165.
- Kasianov, Georgiy (2022). Memory Crash: Politics of History in and around Ukraine, 1980s–2010s. Budapest; New York: Central European University Press. ISBN 978-963-386-381-7.
- Kasianov, Georgiy (2023). "Nationalist Memory Narratives and the Politics of History in Ukraine since the 1990s" (PDF). Nationalities Papers. 52 (6). Cambridge University Press.
- Motyka, Grzegorz (2022). From the Volhynian Massacre to Operation Vistula. The Polish-Ukrainian Conflict 1943–1947. Paderborn: Brill.
- Rossoliński-Liebe, Grzegorz (2014). Stepan Bandera: The Life and Afterlife of a Ukrainian Nationalist. Fascism, Genocide, and Cult. Stuttgart: Ibidem Press. ISBN 978-3-8382-0604-2.
- Shkandrij, Myroslav (2015). Ukrainian Nationalism: Politics, Ideology, and Literature, 1929–1956. New Haven: Yale University Press.
- Wilson, Andrew (1996). Ukrainian Nationalism in the 1990s: A Minority Faith. Cambridge University Press. ISBN 978-052-157-457-0.
