= Valentina Battler =

Soviet-born musician, artist and poet

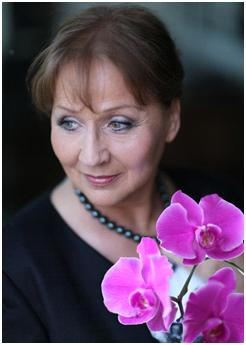
- Born: Valentina Vladimirovna Barannik; November 18, 1946 (age 79); Astrakhan, Russian SFSR, USSR
- Known for: Chinese ink painting, poetry, music
- Spouse: Alex Battler
- Website: www.valentinabattlerart.com

Valentina Battler (née Barannik, known as Alieva until 1995; born November 18, 1946, Astrakhan) is a musician, artist and poet who holds American and Canadian citizenship. Trained as a concert pianist at the Leningrad Conservatory, she has worked since the mid-1990s in the technique of Chinese ink painting under the pen name Wang Liushi (Chinese: 王柳诗), accompanying each of her paintings with a poem of her own.

Her work has been shown at the Shanghai Art Museum, the State Museum of Oriental Art in Moscow and the International Centre of the Roerichs, and is held in the collections of the latter and of the Wu Changshuo Memorial Museum in Shanghai.

== Early life and education ==
Battler was born in Astrakhan. She graduated from the Mussorgsky Music College in Astrakhan and then from the Leningrad Conservatory, where she studied piano. She taught for many years at the Gnessin Russian Academy of Music in Moscow and, after emigrating, at the Royal Conservatory in Vancouver.

In 1993 she emigrated to Canada together with her husband, the historian and political writer Alex Battler. On October 9, 1995, in Vancouver, the couple legally changed their names; Valentina Alieva became Valentina Battler. In the early 2000s they lived in Oxford, later in France, and since the late 2000s in the United States.

== Work ==
Battler took up Chinese painting in 1996 while living in Canada. She had no formal training as an artist and studied the technique and history of Chinese painting on her own, partly from books and material found on the Internet.

The pen name Wang Liushi derives from her family nickname "Va-lyu-sha" and was suggested by the cosmonaut Yuri Baturin; in the press it has been rendered as "queen of weeping willows and poems".

She paints in ink on xuan paper. Each work is preceded by a poem in the classical shi form or by an aphorism of her own composition, and in her published albums every reproduction is accompanied by her verse; reviewers have described this combination of painting and poetry as the distinguishing feature of her work. She works both in the classical genres of Chinese painting — flowers and birds, landscape — and on subjects of European origin.

Her first Moscow solo exhibition, in 2000, was covered by Interfax and by the television channels Rossiya, Kultura and TNT. In March 2003 a panel of experts of the Ministry of Culture of the People's Republic of China classified her work as Chinese painting and approved the exhibition shown that year at the Shanghai Art Museum.

In her work of the 2010s she has combined Chinese technique with the Japanese method of painting on water (suminagashi) and has painted on yupo paper.

== Exhibitions ==
- 2000 — The Soul of Mine, Central House of Artists (hall 18), Moscow, June – July 16
- 2001 — Chinese Painting by Wang Liushi, International Centre of the Roerichs, Moscow, January 29 – February 18
- 2003 — Shanghai Art Museum, Shanghai, August 12–18
- 2003 — Rhymes and Images, Central House of Artists (hall 24), Moscow, September 9–26
- 2004 — Music of Silence, State Museum of Oriental Art, Moscow, June 4–25
- 2006 — Symphonie de l'encre, International Stella Gallery, Paris, September
- 2011 — Music of Silence, Rogue Space Gallery, New York, September 7–12
- 2012 — Form & Fancy, fordPROJECT, New York, April 17 – June 1
- 2024 — Life and Reflection, Boca Raton Public Library, Florida, October 21 – December 6

In 2003 she took part in the group exhibition Unearthly Worlds of Earthly Artists at the International Centre of the Roerichs (October 12 – November 9); the painting she showed there, Spring Song. Lotus, entered the centre's collection.

== Works in public collections ==
- International Centre of the Roerichs, Moscow — Spring Song. Lotus (2000)
- Wu Changshuo Memorial Museum, Shanghai

== Books ==
Battler is the author of the following albums and books; some of them were written together with her husband, Alex Battler:

- Battler, Valentina. The Judas Kiss: The Path of Betrayal. Scholarica, 2025. (ISBN 978-1-7355989-7-0)
- Battler, Valentina. Potselui Iudy. Puti predatelstva [The Judas Kiss: The Path of Betrayal]. Scholarica, 2025 (ISBN 978-1-7355989-8-7); e-book edition: Scholarica, 2026, 282 pp. (ISBN 979-8-9962984-2-6). (in Russian)
- Battler, Valentina and Alex. Svet i T'ma: duel' v iskusstve [Light and Darkness: A Duel in Art]. Scholarica, 2024. 338 pp. (in Russian)
- Battler, Valentina. Life and Reflections. Scholarica, 2020. 392 pp. (ISBN 978-1-7355989-0-1)
- Battler, Valentina. Zhizn' i otrazheniia [Life and Reflections]. Scholarica, 2020. 392 pp. (in Russian)
- Battler, Valentina and Alex. Mneniia i istina. Stat'i ob iskusstve i literature [Opinions and Truth: Articles on Art and Literature]. 2nd ed. Scholarica, 2019. 280 pp. First edition: Moscow: ITRK, 2015, 272 pp. (ISBN 978-5-88010-343-0). (in Russian)
- Battler, Valentina. Art of Ink Painting. 2nd ed. Charleston, 2012. (ISBN 978-1-4793-0252-9)
- Battler, Valentina (Wang Liushi). Muzyka tishiny [Music of Silence]. Moscow, 2011. 224 pp. (ISBN 978-5-86472-227-5) (in Russian)
- Eily, Raf and Valentina [Battler, Alex and Valentina]. Immigratsiia v Severnuiu Ameriku [Immigration to North America]. Moscow: Informdinamo, 1997. 112 pp. (in Russian)
