= Ted Williams (media personality) =

American media personality (born 1957)

- Born: Theodore Fred Williams; September 22, 1957 (age 69); New York City, New York, U.S.
- Other name: The Man with the Golden Voice
- Occupations: Announcer; radio personality; voice-over artist; sportscaster
- Years active: 2011−present
- Spouse: Carol Gibson (m. 2014)
- Children: 9

Theodore Fred Williams (born September 22, 1957), also known as The Man with the Golden Voice, is an American announcer, radio personality, actor and voice-over artist.

Born in Brooklyn, New York, Williams first gained minor fame in the early 1980s, as a late-night radio disc jockey on WVKO in Columbus, Ohio. After over a decade in radio, Williams was dismissed in 1994 for alcoholism and drug abuse, and he soon found himself homeless.

In January 2011, Williams received widespread media attention when an interview, filmed during a period when he was homeless, went viral after being posted to YouTube, and Williams subsequently received numerous job offers. For the first time in almost 20 years, Williams found himself steadily working. He co-authored A Golden Voice: How Faith, Hard Work, and Humility Brought Me from the Streets to Salvation with Bret Witter. He also has been on WATP Live, a podcast about podcasts. He had a small part in the critically acclaimed 2025 film Marty Supreme.

== Background ==
Ted Williams, who is of African American heritage, was born and raised in Brooklyn, New York City. He served three years in the United States Army, was honorably discharged, and attended school for voice acting. His inspiration to become a radio announcer came from a field trip in 1971 at age fourteen, when he found that a radio announcer, whom he had heard, looked nothing like he had imagined. Williams later worked overnight shifts for WVKO in Columbus when the station played soul music.

According to Williams, his life started falling apart in 1986 with a combination of drug and alcohol abuse plus a loss of interest in his career. In 1994, he was evicted from his house. During this period, Williams was arrested at least seven times on charges including theft, drug possession, escape, and robbery. He was also issued misdemeanor citations for drug abuse, criminal trespassing, and pedestrian solicitation. These resulted in two jail sentences, with Williams serving three months in 1990 for theft and nearly two months in 2004 for theft, forgery, and obstructing official business.

Williams is a father of nine children: two boys and seven girls.

== Recognition and response ==
Doral Chenoweth, a videographer for the Columbus Dispatch in Columbus, Ohio, recorded an interview with Williams, and posted the interview on the newspaper's website on January 3, 2011. Recorded during a period when Williams was homeless, Williams was shown standing next to traffic, holding a cardboard sign with a handwritten advertisement of his voice and a request for donations. In the recording, Chenoweth asked Williams to demonstrate his voice. The video showed a disheveled Williams gratefully receiving a donation and improvising a polished radio station promo. The video concluded with a short interview where Williams elaborated on his education and the problems that led to his homelessness. The video was reposted to YouTube.

On January 5, 2011, Williams appeared on local radio programs and was interviewed by The Early Show on CBS. He was interviewed on Today, January 6, doing the lead-in voice-over, revealing that he was to have an interview to do voice-overs for Kraft Foods. On January 10, a fundraiser website, TedWilliamsYourVoice, was set up to support Williams.

Subsequently, Williams received several job offers. On January 5, 2011, the Cleveland Cavaliers NBA basketball team offered him a job and a home. The offer called for Williams to do full-time voice-over work with the Cavaliers and Quicken Loans Arena. Williams responded, "That's the best deal ever!" On January 7, 2011, Williams was officially hired by MSNBC to provide voice-overs for the network. Williams was also hired to be the voice behind Kraft Foods' new TV campaign, which launched on ESPN during the 2011 Kraft Fight Hunger Bowl on January 9.

In April 2011, Williams returned to Columbus as part of shooting a commercial for a local store and a reality show.

=== Continued voiceover work ===
In November 2011, New England Cable News announced that Williams had joined NECN as the official voice of the New England cable channel and would be working out of his at-home studio in Dublin, Ohio.

In February 2012, he became 'The Golden Voice of Love' to promote Kraft's Mac & Cheese in a YouTube campaign. He read selected tweeted declarations of love between February 12 and 14.

In a January 2013 segment for Today, Williams revealed that he now lives in an apartment and is steadily employed as a commercial voice-over artist for Kraft Macaroni & Cheese, and spends a lot of his time helping the homeless. The reporter claimed he still had strained relationships with his "seven" children. He has also started the Ted Williams Project with Kraft, a non-profit foundation that provides necessities to homeless shelters.

On September 16, 2013, Williams visited Access Hollywood Live to talk about narrating his new film, Houseless. It gives an inside look at the harsh realities of living homeless on the streets. Williams also discussed how he has decided to surround himself with the right people as well as the daily struggles of staying sober.

In June 2015, Williams announced on "Now With Scott Spears" on WWGH Radio that he was running for President of the United States as an Independent candidate in the 2016 election. Williams withdrew his candidacy through an announcement on his Facebook page on August 26, expressing his frustration over the candidacy of Donald Trump.

In addition, Williams voiced TV commercials for Pepsi for its updated "Joy of Pepsi" ad campaign with the tagline "We put the AHHH in cola."

In December 2015, Williams announced on a Facebook video that he will return to WVKO as the morning show host beginning on Monday January 4, 2016. As of April 2016, Ted Williams and the Golden Voice was no longer part of WVKO programming.

As of October 2019, he was working on a new reality show called Second Chance.

On April 23, 2021, Williams announced on "Now With Scott Spears" on WWGH Radio that he was running for Governor of Ohio in 2022 as a Democrat. He later retracted this decision.

Williams appeared in the 2025 film Marty Supreme as Ted, a table tennis parlor employee. Despite some concerns from the crew regarding union complications and the costs of bringing Williams in from out-of-state, director Josh Safdie insisted on having Williams appear in the film for the qualities of his voice, as the character fulfills the role of an announcer.

== Substance abuse ==
Williams said he had remained sober since mid-2008, but started drinking again after the media attention. On January 12, 2011, after a lengthy one-on-one talk with TV psychologist "Dr. Phil" McGraw, Williams admitted to drinking alcohol heavily again and agreed to go to Origins Recovery Center, a drug rehab facility in Texas arranged by McGraw. He had also made the commitment to attend alcohol rehabilitation courses. Williams checked himself out of the rehab facility after 12 days.

Later, in February 2011, Williams, reflecting on why he had left the rehab facility, said to reporters that "I love Dr. Phil. I don't want to bash him in any way. I walked out of treatment because it was a little scripted, I felt. There was no anonymity. I want him to know that his cares and his concerns will not be in vain. I am going to try and truly get back into the swing of things." Later that month, the reality show Second Chances at Life was announced to be in pre-production with Williams as host. A second season was planned, but never came to fruition.

On March 9, 2011, Williams was interviewed again on Today, where he thanked his voice-over mentors, Randy Thomas and Joe Cipriano, and reported he was doing well and living in a sober house in Studio City, Los Angeles, California.

On May 6, 2011, it was announced that Williams would be entering the Origins Recovery Center in South Padre Island, Texas, for emotional reasons and not for narcotic reasons. Williams' book and reality show were put on break until Williams returned home. The following day, The News-Herald reported that the Cleveland Cavaliers had retracted their earlier job offer to Williams.

On May 14, 2012, Williams made an appearance in an interview on The Today Show with Kathie Lee Gifford and Hoda Kotb. In the interview he said he had been clean and sober for over a year, was working, and is doing well. In his book, A Golden Voice: How Faith, Hard Work, and Humility Brought Me from the Streets to Salvation, he reflects on his time prostituting himself and his girlfriend while abandoning his children for his cocaine addiction. Later that month, Williams appeared on The Wendy Williams Show to discuss his post-fame relapse and subsequent cleaning up. He also talked about finally beginning to reconcile with his nine children, and living with his fiancée.

During a January 2026 interview with his manager, Anthony T. Scott, Williams revealed that he relapsed due to the death of his mother, girlfriend, and best friend. In the interview, Williams admitted that he was high on fentanyl. Before, he held a job at a tire repair shop. With the assistance of Scott, Williams checked into the Origins Recovery Center again on March 10, 2026.

== Voice-over work ==
- Today, January 6, 2011 (Lead in)
- Late Night with Jimmy Fallon, January 6, 2011
- The Rachel Maddow Show, January 6, 2011
- MSNBC's "Lean Forward" campaign, January 6, 2011
- Kraft's "You Know You Love It: Dad's in the Doghouse" Macaroni and Cheese campaign, January 7, 2011
- Dr. Phil, January 11–12, 2011
- The Soup, January 14, 2011
- The Dish, January 16, 2011
- Houseless, September 10, 2013
- "Joy of Pepsi" advertisement

== See also ==
- Emily Zamourka
