= Valentina Linkova =

Russian archery biathlete

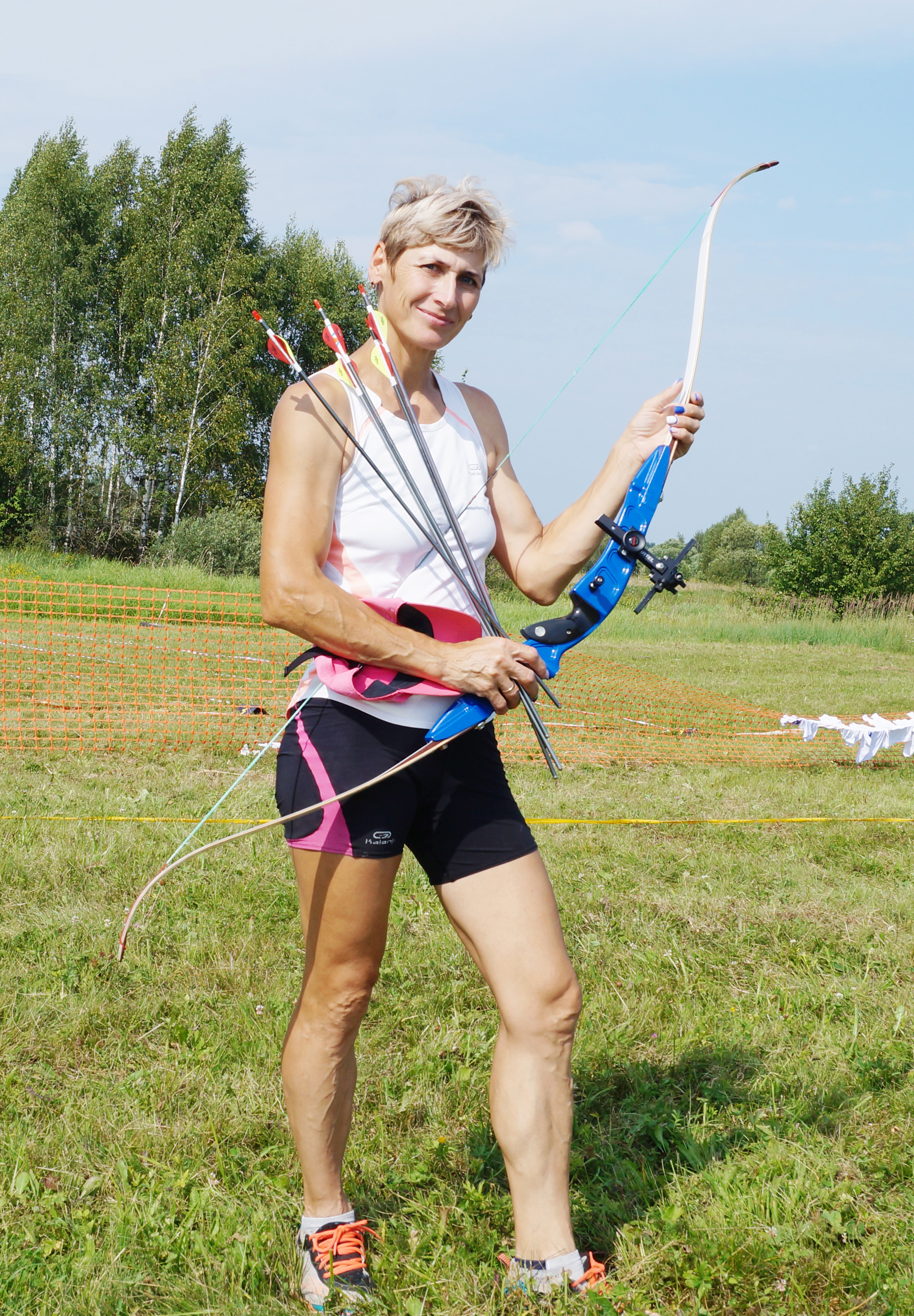
- Valentina Linkova

Personal information
- Nationality: Russian
- Born: 1970 (age 55–56)

Sport
- Sport: Archery biathlon; run archery

Valentina Leonidovna Linkova (Russian: Валентина Леонидовна Линькова; born 1970) is a Russian winter archery biathlete and run archer.

Along with Natalija Jemelina, Valentina Linkova is the most successful archery biathlete of the second half of the first decade of the 2000s. At the 2005 World Championships in Forni Avoltri, she won the title in the last relay race with Olga Simushina and Yekaterina Vasilyevna Lugovkina. In the sprint, she also won the title ahead of her relay mates, and in the pursuit she fell behind the two and came third. Two years later she became the most successful participant in the World Cup in Moscow. In the individual race she won the title before Lugovkina and Simushina, in the sprint before Jelena Sharafutdinova and Lugovkina, in the pursuit before Lugowkina and Jemelina. At the European Championships in Moscow in 2008, Linkowa won silver medals behind Jemelina and ahead of Sharafutdinova both in the sprint and in the pursuit race. To this day Linkowa leads the result lists of Russian archery biathlon competitions as the most experienced Russian archery biathlete, as she dominated the Russian Cup 2012/2013.

Parallel to her great success in the bow biathlon, Linkova began in 2004 a successful career in run archery and competed in the national championships in Izhevsk. In 2011, she entered the open Dutch championships in The Hague in the men's class for lack of female competition, and took the bronze medal behind her compatriot Maxim Menschikow, ahead of all the Dutch starters. In the same competition she had won bronze in the women's the year before. In 2012 she won silver there and two gold medals in the relay and mass start women's races at the open German championships.
