= Alex Battler =

Soviet-born scholar and political writer

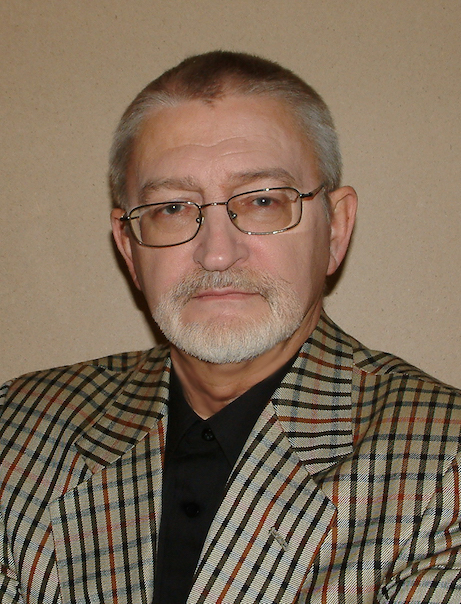
- Born: December 10, 1946 (age 79); Astrakhan, USSR
- Citizenship: United States, Canada
- Education: Leningrad State University
- Spouse: Valentina Battler (m. 1970)
- Children: 2

Philosophical work
- Institutions: Institute of World Economy and International Relations; Moscow State Institute of International Relations; Nagoya University; University of British Columbia
- Main interests: History, international relations theories, comparative country studies, philosophy (ontology), religion, economics, sociology, political sciences, natural sciences (Big Bang theories, anthropology, consciousness, cybernetics), contemporary art
- Notable works: War as Law: Ukraine, Russia, and Capitalism (2026); Beyond Art: A Critical Analysis (2024); Marxology: Civilization versus Formation (2024); The Science of God, 6 vols. (2019–2022); Mirology: Progress and Force in World Relations, 2 vols. (2014–2015); Society: Progress and Force (2008); Dialectics of Force: Ontóbia (2005); The 21st Century: The World without Russia (2004); Asia-Pacific Region: Myths, Illusions and Reality (1997)
- Notable ideas: Ontóbia, deion, fibia, orgábia, cosmobia; Kinobia, kinognosis; Foreign policy potential (FPP); Law of geoeconomics (poles); law of geostrategy (center of force); First Principle (law of social force); Second Principle (law of social knowledge); Laws of love and family; Three axioms and two laws of capitalism
- Website: www.olegarin.com/en

Alex Battler (born Rafik Shagi-Akzamovich Aliyev, Russian: Рафик Шаги-Акзамович Алиев; December 10, 1946), known in Russia under the pen name Oleg Alekseyevich Arin (Note: In this name that follows East Slavic naming customs, the patronymic is Alekseyevich and the family name is Arin.) (Russian: Олег Алексеевич Арин), is a scholar and political writer. Born in the Soviet Union, he holds American and Canadian citizenship.

== Life and career ==
Alex Battler was born in Astrakhan. In 1966 he entered the Faculty of Oriental studies of the A. Zhdanov Leningrad State University. After graduating in 1971, he enrolled in the post-graduate school at the Institute of the Far Eastern Studies in Moscow. In 1975 he was conferred the Degree of Candidate of Science (= PhD), and in 1988 the degree of Doctor of Science in the specialty "history of foreign policy and international relations".

In 1993 he immigrated to Canada where he acquired Canadian citizenship. On October 9, 1995, in Vancouver, he legally changed his name from Rafik Shagi-Akzamovich Aliyev to Alex Battler. In 1997 he returned to Russia and worked at several institutions of higher learning in Moscow. In 2001 he moved to the United Kingdom; later he lived for several years in France. He now lives in the United States.

Through the years he held various positions at different research institutions: the Institute of the Far Eastern Studies; the Institute of World Economy and International Relations; the Institute of Social Sciences of the CPSU Central Committee; Moscow State Institute of International Relations of the Russian Federation's Ministry of Foreign Affairs; the Institute of Philosophy. He served as Director of the Institute of Economic and International Studies of the Pacific Region (Vladivostok).

He also taught as a professor of political science, economics, and international relations at several universities and institutes in Russia (Moscow State University; the Institute of Philosophy; the International Independent University of Ecology & Political Science); in Japan (Nagoya University); in Canada (the University of British Columbia).

== Work ==
Battler is the author of more than 500 published works, including 53 books, across a range of academic fields.

The six-volume work The Science of God, together with Atheism: A Battle against Religion, differs from comparable studies in that each volume is devoted to a separate aspect of religion, and each of these aspects constitutes an independent field of research within theology, philosophy, politics and sociology: The Phenomenology of the Bible (vol. I), The Ideology of Christianity (vol. II), The Philosophy of Christianity (vol. III), Christianity and Politics (vol. IV), Religion: Science and Society (vol. V), Religion: Action and Counteraction (vol. VI). Each volume offers a critical analysis of the views of leading specialists on the subject — both proponents and opponents of religion — from antiquity to the present day.

According to the author, the study led to a number of conclusions about the historical role of religion and its effect on the development of modern states (the United States, Europe, Islamic states, China, Japan) that differ substantially from generally accepted views. In particular, the terms atheism and atheist are redefined. Battler defines them as follows: atheism is a system of views that denies the ontological existence of gods and explains the political and economic causes of their existence in social relations; an atheist is a person who does not accept the existence of gods in being but recognizes their existence in social consciousness.

He further formulates what he calls the law of religion, together with a number of regularities derived from it. In his formulation, the degree of a country's progressiveness is inversely proportional to the degree of its religiosity: the more religious a country, the less developed it is. From this he derives the regularities that the more religious a country, the worse its economy develops; the lower the standard of living; the higher the mortality rate; the poorer the education; the weaker the sciences; the greater the number of social problems (crime, alcoholism — in non-Muslim countries — and suicide); and the fewer political freedoms it has. As a general indicator he points to average life expectancy.

In the two-volume Mirology: Progress and Force in World Relations the author reformulates the key concepts of world and international relations and, on that basis, derives a number of axioms and laws which, in his account, govern the modern world. The work also contains a detailed critical analysis of the writings of leading theorists of international relations in the West, Japan, China and Russia. The two volumes (ITRK, 2014–2015) were reviewed by the historian Andrei Fursov in the journal Znanie. Ponimanie. Umenie and in Literaturnaya Gazeta.

In his philosophical works Battler sets out a number of laws and regularities in philosophy, sociology and the theory of international relations, which he derives by redefining key terms as concepts and categories. Central among them is the category of force, which in Dialectics of Force he develops into ontóbia (ontological force) and treats as an attribute of being alongside matter, motion, time and space. On that basis he advances his own version of the Big Bang and of the expansion of the universe. In the organic world, on his account, ontóbia becomes orgábia (organic force); he holds that life in the full sense begins with man, and he applies the theory to the problems of consciousness and thought.

In Society: Progress and Force (Criteria and First Principles) Battler proposes new definitions of progress and of the ways social force manifests itself, formulated as the First Principle of social development, or the law of social force, and the Second Principle, or the law of social knowledge. The book was reviewed by Yuri Baturin in the philosophical journal Voprosy Filosofii. In On Love, Family, and the State he sets out laws of love and family, which he links to the growth of entropy.

Within the theory of international relations Battler formulates, in The 21st Century: The World without Russia, two laws: the law of geoeconomics (poles) and the law of geostrategy (center of force). He also introduces the notion of the foreign policy potential of a state, with methods for calculating it and for setting the proportion of expenditure on foreign policy appropriate to a state's foreign policy goals.

== Publications ==
=== Academic works ===
- Battler, Alex. Beyond Art: A Critical Analysis [За гранью искусства. Критический анализ - in Russian]. Scholarica, 2024. – 244 p.
- Battler, Alex. Marxology: Civilization versus Formation [Марксология: Цивилизация против Формации - in Russian]. Scholarica, 2024. – 136 p.
- Battler, Alex. Contemporary International Relations. Great Power Politics: Theory and Practice. Lectures. Scholarica, 2023. – 498 p. ISBN 979-8-8578-6078-6
- Battler, Alex. Contemporary International Relations. The Politics of the Great Powers: Theory and Practice. Course of lectures.( in Russian) Scholarica, 2022. – 496 p.
- Arin. Atheism: A Battle against Religion. Scholarica (in Russian), 2022. – 254 p.
- Arin. The Science of God. Volume VI. Religion: Action and Counteraction. Scholarica (in Russian), 2022. – 390 p.
- Arin. The Science of God. Volume V. Religion: Science and Society. Scholarica (in Russian), 2021. – 524 p.
- Battler, Alex. On Love, Family, and the State: Philosophical-sociological Essay. /Second edition. Scholarica, 2021. –– 190 p. ISBN 978-1-7355989-5-6
- Arin. The Science of God. Volume IV. Christianity and Politics. Scholarica (in Russian), 2021. – 566 p.
- Arin, Oleg. Tsarist Russia: The Collapse of Capitalism (Late 19th – Early 20th Century). Scholarica (in Russian), 2020. – 354 p.
- Arin, Oleg. The 21st Century: The World without Russia [Двадцать первый век: мир без России - in Russian]. Scholarica, 2020. – 504 p. First edition: Moscow: Alyans, 2001. – 352 p. (ISBN 5-93558-003-9); reissued as Мир без России. Moscow: EKSMO•Algoritm, 2002. – 480 p. (ISBN 5-699-00854-3)
- Battler, Alex. The Twenty-First Century: The World Without Russia. Scholarica, 2020. – 418 p. First edition: American University & Colleges Press, 2004. – 388 p. (ISBN 978-1-58982-121-7)
- 21 Shiji: meiyou eluosi de shijie (The 21st Century: The World without Russia), Shanghai (In Chinese), 2005. – 438 p. (ISBN 7-208-05794-X)
- Battler, Alex. Society: Progress and Force. Criteria and First Principles. Second edition. Scholarica, 2020. – 400 p. (ISBN 978-1-7355989-3-2). Also: New York, 2013. – 375 p. (ISBN 978-1-4800-0825-0). Book review.
- Battler, Alex. Dialectics of Force: Ontobia. Second edition. Scholarica, 2020. – 330 p. (ISBN 978-1-7355989-2-5). Also: New York, 2013. – 322 p. (ISBN 978-1-4840-0885-0). Book review.
- Battler, Alex. On Love, Family, and the State [О любви, семье и государстве - in Russian]. Scholarica, 2020. – 202 p.
- Arin. The Science of God. Volume III. The Philosophy of Christianity. Scholarica (in Russian), 2019. – 516 p.
- Arin. The Science of God. Volume II. The Ideology of Christianity. Scholarica (in Russian), 2019. – 380 p.
- Arin. The Science of God. Volume I. The Phenomenology of the Bible. Scholarica (in Russian), 2019. – 468 p.
- Battler, Alex. Society: Progress and Force (Criteria and First Principles) [Общество: прогресс и сила (критерии и основные начала) - in Russian]. Scholarica, 2019. – 386 p.
- Battler, Alex. Dialectics of Force: Ontóbia [Диалектика силы: онто́бия - in Russian]. Scholarica, 2019. – 320 p.
- Battler, Alex. Eurasia: Illusions and Reality [Евразия: иллюзии и реальность - in Russian]. Scholarica, 2019. – 136 p.
- Battler, Alex. Mirology: Progress and Force in World Relations. Vol. II. Struggle of All against All [Мирология. Прогресс и сила в мировых отношениях - in Russian]. Scholarica, 2019. – 818 p.
- Battler, Alex. Mirology: Progress and Force in World Relations. Vol. I. Introduction to Mirology [Мирология. Введение в мирологию - in Russian]. Scholarica, 2019. – 266 p.
- Arin, Oleg. My Wife and I – Agents of the CIA. Moscow: Publishing House ITRK, 2018. – 416 p. (ISBN 978-5-88010-470-3).
- Arin, Oleg. The Strategic Contours of East Asia in 21st Century. Russia: Not a Step Forward [Стратегические контуры Восточной Азии. Россия: ни шагу вперед - in Russian]. Moscow: Alyans, 2001. – 192 p. (ISBN 5-93558-004-7); reissued as Россия: ни шагу вперед. Moscow: EKSMO, 2003. – 352 p. (ISBN 5-699-01580-9)
- Arin, Oleg. Japan: View on the World, Asia and Russia [Япония: взгляд на мир, на Азию и Россию - in Russian]. Moscow: MGIMO, 2001. – 92 p. (ISBN 5-9228-0035-3)
- Arin, Oleg. The Strategic Perspectives of Russia in Eastern Asia [Стратегические перспективы России в Восточной Азии - in Russian]. Moscow: MGIMO, 1999. – 112 p.
- Arin, Oleg. Asia-Pacific Region: Myths, Illusions and Reality. Eastern Asia: Economy, Politics and Security [АТР: мифы, иллюзии и реальность - in Russian]. Moscow: Flinta; Nauka, 1997. – 436 p. (ISBN 5-89349-037-1; ISBN 5-02-013663-8)
- Aliyev R.Sh.-A. Japan's Foreign Policy in 70s – early 80s: Theory and Practice [Внешняя политика Японии в 70-х – начале 80-х годов (теория и практика) - in Russian]. Moscow: Nauka (GRVL), 1986. – 312 p.
- Aliyev R. Japan and the Soviet-Chinese Relations [Япония и советско-китайские отношения - in Russian]. Information bulletin No. 70. Moscow: Institute of Far Eastern Studies, 1976. – 197 p.

=== Popular works ===
- Battler, Alex. War as Law: Ukraine, Russia, and Capitalism. Facing Reality. Scholarica, 2026. – 338 p. (ISBN 979-8-9962984-5-7)
- Battler, Alex. War as Law: Ukraine, Russia, and Capitalism. Facing Reality [Война как закон. Украина, Россия и капитализм. Лицом к реальности - in Russian]. Scholarica, 2026. – 326 p. (ISBN 979-8-9962984-4-0)
- Arin, Oleg. The World Through the Eyes of a Sovok. Book III. Life of a Sovok under Russian Capitalism [Мир глазами «совка». Книга III. Жизнь «совка» при русском капитализме - in Russian]. Scholarica, 2025. – 232 p.
- Arin, Oleg. The World Through the Eyes of a Sovok. Book II. Life of a Sovok under Western Capitalism [Мир глазами «совка». Книга II. Жизнь «совка» при западном капитализме - in Russian]. Scholarica, 2025. – 184 p.
- Arin, Oleg. Anti-Sovietism [Антисоветчик - in Russian]. Scholarica, 2025. – 466 p.
- Arin, Oleg. The World Through the Eyes of a Sovok. Book I. Life of a Sovok under Soviet Socialism. Part Three: A Sovok Anti-Sovietist in the Perestroika Era [Мир глазами «совка». Книга I. Часть третья. Совок-антисоветчик в эпоху перестройки - in Russian]. Scholarica, 2025. – 160 p.
- Arin, Oleg. The World Through the Eyes of a Sovok. Book I. Part Two: Socialism, a Steeplechase [Мир глазами «совка». Книга I. Часть вторая. Социализм: бег с препятствиями - in Russian]. Scholarica, 2025. – 242 p.
- Arin, Oleg. The World Through the Eyes of a Sovok. Book I. Part One: Born in Astrakhan [Мир глазами «совка». Книга I. Часть первая. Урождённый в Астрахани - in Russian]. Scholarica, 2025. – 208 p.
- Battler, Alex. Studies in Literature and the Russian Anglo-Speak [Литературоведческие этюды и русский англояз - in Russian]. Scholarica, 2024. – 108 p.
- Battler, Valentina and Alex. Light and Darkness: A Duel in Art [Свет и Тьма: дуэль в искусстве - in Russian]. Scholarica, 2024. – 338 p.
- Battler, Alex. Valentina Battler's Magic of Life and Creativity: The Portrait of Family Happiness [Магия жизни и творчества Валентины Бэттлер. Живопись семейного счастья - in Russian]. Scholarica, 2023. – 236 p.
- Arin, Oleg. Russia: March to the Execution (Putin-ism, If-ism, Russo-bluff-ism) [Россия: шествие на казнь - in Russian]. Scholarica, 2022. – 228 p.
- Arin, Oleg. Russia vs the West: Revanche (Lectures, articles, prognoses) [Россия vs Запад: реванш - in Russian]. Scholarica, 2022. – 282 p.
- Battler, Valentina and Alex. Opinions and Truth. Articles about Art and Literature [Мнения и истина. Статьи об искусстве и литературе - in Russian]. Second edition. Scholarica, 2019. – 280 p. First edition: Moscow: ITRK, 2015. – 272 p. (ISBN 978-5-88010-343-0)
- Arin, Oleg. Destroyers of the Brain. On Russian Pseudo-science [Разрушители мозга. О российской лженауке - in Russian]. Scholarica, 2019. – 368 p. First edition: Разрушители мозга (Ненаучная наука России). Moscow: ITRK, 2015. – 368 p. (ISBN 978-5-88010-350-8)
- Arin, Oleg. Russia on the Roadside of the World [Россия на обочине мира - in Russian]. Second edition. Scholarica, 2019. – 382 p. First edition: Moscow: Linor, 1999. – 292 p. (ISBN 5-900889-70-X)
- Arin Oleg (Alex Battler). Russia between East and West. (In Russian). Moscow: Izdatelstvo ITRK, 2015. – 304 p. (ISBN 978-5-88010-346-1)
- Arin, Oleg. Russian mindset [Русский умострой - in Russian]. Moscow: ITRK, 2015. – 336 p. (ISBN 978-5-88010-322-5)
- Arin Oleg. The formula of current Russia: marasmus in cube but with zero result [Формула современной России: Маразм в кубе, но с нулевым результатом. – М.: ЛЕНАНД, 2009. – 256 с. (ISBN 978-5-9710-0258-1)]
- Arin Oleg, Alex Battler. Russia in Intoxication of Dollargasm and If-ism [Россия в угаре долларгазма и еслибизма. – М.: Едиториал УРСС, 2008. – 288 с. (ISBN 978-5-382-00718-2)]
- Arin O. Russia in the Strategic Trap. Second edition. Moscow: Algorithm, 2003 [Россия в стратегическом капкане Изд. 2-е., расширенное. – М.: Алгоритм, 2003. – 352 с.]

First edition: Россия в стратегическом капкане. – М. Флинта, 1997. – 286 с. (ISBN 5-89349-038-X)

- Battler Alex and Valentina. Immigration to North America. The advices of Russian-Canadians [Иммиграция в Северную Америку. – М.: Информдинамо, 1997. – 112 с.] Published under the names Raf and Valentina Eily.

=== Selected academic books (coauthored) ===
Alex Battler is a co-author of more than twenty collective monographs and books. Among them particularly:

- Arin Oleg. The Methodology of superlongterm prognosis (p. 33–40); Prognosis of the development of world relations in 21st century (p. 483–554) [Методология сверхдолгосрочного прогноза (с. 33–40); Прогноз развития мировых отношений в XXI веке (с. 483–554)] In: Astronautics in 21st century. An endeavor of a forecast up to 2101 [Космонавтика XXI века. Попытка прогноза развития до 2101 г./ Под ред. академика РАН Б.Е. Чертока. – М.: Издательство «РТСофт», 2010. – 864 с. (ISBN 978-5-903545-10-0)]
- Arin O. Russia's role in economic cooperation with East-Asian countries [Роль России в экономическом сотрудничестве со странами Восточной Азии (с. 22–40)] – In: New trends in international relations in Asia [В: Новые тенденции в международных отношениях в Азии. – М.: ИВ РАН, 2002. – 242 с. (ISBN 5-94425-009-7)]
- Aliev R.A. Russia and the countries of Northeastern Asia: problems and perspectives of economic cooperation [Россия и страны Северо-Восточной Азии: проблемы и перспективы экономического сотрудничества (с. 94–149)]. In: Economic interests of Russia in contiguous regions [В: Экономические интересы России в сопредельных районах. М.:МГИМО, 2000. – 150 с.]
- Arin O.A. Russia's place and role in strategic doctrines and concepts of the USA [Место и роль России в стратегических доктринах и концепциях США (с. 20–34)]. In: Scientific works of MNEPU [В.: Научные труды МНЭПУ. Серия Политология. Выпуск 3, Москва, 2000. – 234 с. (ISBN 5-7383-0119-6)]
- Aliev R.Sh.-A. Security and economic conjuncture in Pacific Ocean zone [Безопасность и экономическая конъюнктура в Тихоокеанской зоне (с. 112–125)]. – In Problems of security in Asia Pacific region [В: Проблемы обеспечения безопасности в Азиатско-Тихоокеанском регионе. – М.:Научная книга, 1999. – 228 с.]
- Arin O.A. National security: methodological and terminological aspects [Национальная безопасность: методологические и терминологические аспекты (с.77–91)]. In Political culture. Scientific works of MNEPU [В: Политическая культура. Научные труды МНЭПУ. Серия Политология. Выпуск 6. Москва, 1999. – 224 с.]
- Arin Oleg. Place and Role of PRC and Russia in Eastern Asia [Место и роль КНР и России в Восточной Азии (с. 306–317)]. In Orient and Russia at the turn of 21st century [В: Восток и Россия на рубеже XXI века. – М., 1998. – 368 с. (ISBN 5-7307-01586)]
- Aliev R. Sh.-A. Authority and Science or What You Plant is What You Reap [Власть и наука, или как аукнется, так и откликнется (с. 109–131)]. In: The Heartbeat of Reform. Moscow: Progress Publishers [В: Пульс реформ. Юристы и политологи размышляют. Составитель Ю. Батурин. М., Прогресс, 1989. – 378 с.]

In English: Aliyev Rafik. Authority and Science or What You Plant is What You Reap (p. 113–137). In: The Heartbeat of Reform. Moscow: Progress Publishers, 1990. – 370 p. (ISBN 5-01-002560-4)

- Aliyev R.Sh.-A. Glasnost' in the snare of foreign policy and international relations [Гласность в тенетах внешней политики и международных отношений (с.220–237)]. In Glasnost: opinions, analysis, policy. Moscow: Yuridicheskaya Literatura Publishers, 1989: 220–37. [В: Гласность: мнения, поиски, политика. – М.: Юридическая литература, 1989. – 368 с. (ISBN 5-7260-0200-8)]
- Aliyev Rafik. Problems of Security in Asia-Pacific (Study). Chapter 3 (p. 35–47). New Delhi (India), Allied Publishers, 1987. – 184 p.
- Aliev R.Sh.-A. Japan's Pacific Strategy [Тихоокеанская стратегия Японии. (Сс. 64 – 119)]; The Pacific Community and the People's Republic of China [Тихоокеанское сообщество и КНР (с. 222 – 244)]. In The Pacific Community. Outlook. [В: Тихоокеанское сообщество: планы и перспективы]. – М.: Наука, 1987. – 352 с.

In English: Aliev R. Sh.-A. Japan's Pacific Strategy (p. 72–133); The Pacific Community and the People's Republic of China (p. 244–271). In: The Pacific Community. Outlook. Moscow, Progress Publishers, 1988. (ISBN 5-01-000485-2)

=== Reviews and interviews ===
- Fursov A.I. Capitalism and International Relations. Rev.: Battler Alex. Mirology: Progress and Force in the World Relations. Vol. II. Struggle of all against all. Moscow: ITRK, 2015 // «Knowledge. Understanding. Skill», # 4, 2015. (Фурсов А.И. Капитализм и международные отношения. Рец.: А. Бэттлер «Мирология. Прогресс и сила в мировых отношениях». М.: ИТРК, 2015. Т. II. Борьба всех против всех // «Знание. Понимание. Умение», № 4, 2015.)
- Fursov A.I. Into the abyss with capitalism. Rev.: Battler Alex. Mirology: Progress and Force in the World Relations. Vol. II. Struggle of all against all. Moscow: ITRK, 2015 // «Literaturnaya Gazeta», # 1-2, 21 January 2016. (Фурсов А.И. В бездну вместе с капитализмом? Рец.: А. Бэттлер «Мирология. Прогресс и сила в мировых отношениях». М.: ИТРК, 2015. Т. II. Борьба всех против всех // Литературная газета, № 1–2, 21 января 2016.)
- Kirkus Review: Alex Battler. Dialectics of Force: Ontobia. New York, 2013. – 322 p. (ISBN 978-1484008850 // https://www.kirkusreviews.com › author › alex-battler. Reviewed: Aug. 5, 2013.
- Kirkus Review: Alex Battler. Society: Progress and Force (Criteria and First Principles). New York, 2013. – 376 p. (ISBN 978-1480008250) // https://www.kirkusreviews.com › author › alex-battler. Reviewed: May 17, 2013.
- Facts against myths (Факты против мифов // Книжное обозрение, № 27-28, 2009, с. 12.
- Plyakin A. On the way to Iff-lands (Плякин А. На пути в Еслибляндию // НГ ExLIBRIS, 2009-08-27.)
- Current feudalism (Современный феодализм // Книжное обозрение, №25-26, 2009, с. 12.)
- «Bits and pieces» plus democracy («Рожки да ножки» плюс демократия). – Interview published in Russian Journal (Интервью с сокращениями опубликовано // Русский журнал, 08 июня 2009)
- Yu. M. Baturin. A. Battler. Society: progress and force (Criteria and First Principles) [Ю.М. Батурин. – А. Бэттлер. Общество: прогресс и сила (критерии и основные начала) // Вопросы философии, №3, 2009, с. 179-181]
- Baturin Yuri. Progress as delta of life [Батурин Юрий. Прогресс как дельта жизни. (На книгу «Общество: прогресс и сила») // НГ-EX Libris, 22 января 2009 года. С.7.]
- Michail Kheifiz. One more – perhaps senseless endeavor to understand Russia by mind [Михаил Хейфиц. Еще одна – возможно, бессмысленная – попытка понять Россию умом // «Vesty» (Israel), March 18 and April 1, 2004]
- Interview for «Dungfang Zaobao» (China, Shanghai), November 11, 2004, p. 8.
- «We bury ourselves» («Мы сами себя хороним») // Interview for «Zavtra» (February/March, 2003, № 9, p. 5).
- Sokolov B. V. Book Review: O. Arin. The World without Russia. M.: Algoritm, 2002 // Book Review, 16 January 2003 (Соколов Б.В. Арин О. Мир без России. М.: ЭКСМО; Алгоритм, 2002 // Книжное обозрение, 2003-01-16.)
- Yakovlev A.G. Book Review: O. Arin. Asia Pacific Region: Myths, illusions and reality. Eastern Asia: economy, politics, and security. M.: Nauka/Flinta, 1997 // «Problems of Far East», # 3, 1998. (Яковлев А. Г. Рецензия на монографию: О. Арин. Азиатско-тихоокеанский регион: мифы, иллюзии и реальность. Восточная Азия: экономика, политика, безопасность. М.: Флинта, Наука, 1997 // «Проблемы Дальнего Востока», 1998, № 3.)
- Zagorskyi A. Asia Pacific region: scopes of the concept. Book Review: O. Arin. Asia Pacific Region: Myths, illusions and reality. Eastern Asia: economy, politics, and security. M.: Nauka/Flinta, 1997 // «World economy and international relations», # 6, 1999. (Загорский А. Азиатско-тихоокеанский регион: границы понятия. — О. Арин. Азиатско-тихоокеанский регион: мифы, иллюзии и реальность. Восточная Азия: экономика, политика, безопасность. М.: Флинта, Наука, 1997 // «Мировая экономика и международные отношения», 1999, № 6.)
