= Valentina Gestro de Pozzo =

Argentinian journalist (1914–2011)

Valentina Gestro de Pozzo (9 January 1914 – 30 April 2011) was an Argentine showbusiness reporter. She was better known as Tia Valentina (Aunt Valentina).

== Biography ==
Valentina Gestro de Pozzo, born in Buenos Aires, began writing at the age of 19, when her column on local Argentine customs began to be published by a newspaper.

During the 1950s and 1960s, Gestro de Pozzo began writing entertainment gossip for a news and entertainment magazine named "Buenas tardes, Mucho gusto" ("Good Afternoon, Nice To Meet You")

Valentina Gestro de Pozzo joined Argentine television during the 1950s, when she starred in a show also named "Buenas Tardes, Mucho Gusto". She also starred in another television gossip show, "Mujeres A La Hora Del Te" ("Women At Tea Hour"). She is considered one of the pioneers of journalism as well as one of the most relevant journalists in Argentina at the beginning of television.

== Death ==
Gestro de Pozzo died after a few weeks in a local hospital in Buenos Aires, April 30, 2011. No cause of death was announced.

== Honors ==
Gestro de Pozzo was remembered, along with other Argentine luminaries who had died during the time such as Romina Yan, Merlina Licht, Catalina Speroni, Guido Renzi and others, at the 2011 Martin Fierro Awards ceremony.
