= Crispus of Chalcedon =

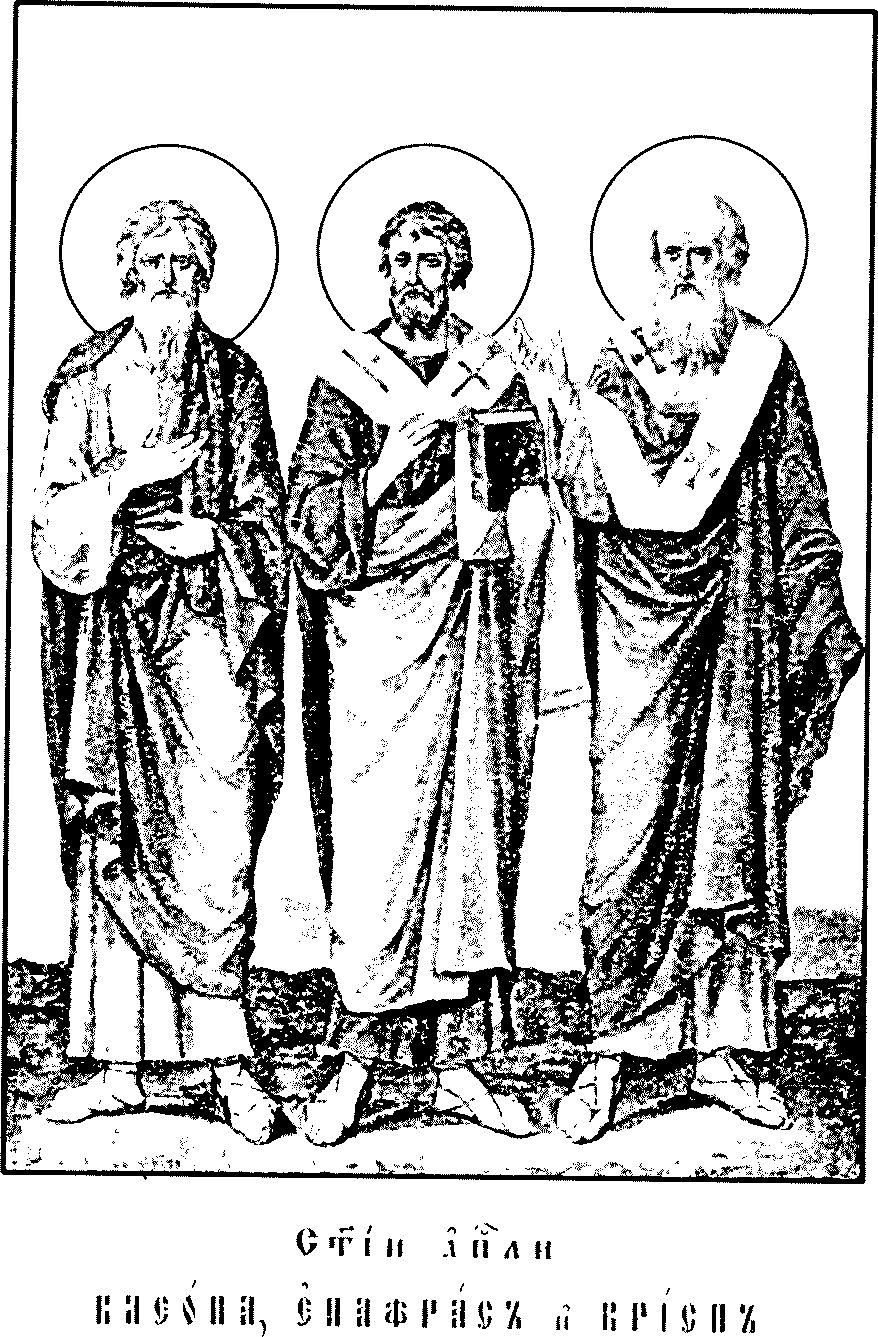

Saint Crispus of Chalcedon was a bishop of Chalcedon. He is mentioned in First Corinthians 1:14. He was a ruler of the Jewish Synagogue at Corinth, and was converted to Christianity by Paul of Tarsus (Acts 18:8). He was baptized by Paul in Corinth, Greece. He later served as Bishop of Chalcedon.

Crispus' feast day is October 4 and he is counted among the Seventy disciples in the Eastern Orthodox Church.
