= Valentina Ruiz Lizárraga =

Mexican politician

Member of the Congress of Sonora Plurinominal
- In office 16 September 1997 – 15 September 2000

Municipal president of Pitiquito
- In office 1994–1997
- Preceded by: Gonzalo Celaya García
- Succeeded by: Ricardo Armando Gutiérrez García

Personal details
- Born: Pitiquito, Sonora, Mexico
- Citizenship: Mexican
- Party: PRI
- Education: Universidad de Sonora (LLB)

Valentina Ruiz Lizárraga is a Mexican politician affiliated with the Institutional Revolutionary Party (PRI). She served in the LV Legislature of the Congress of Sonora from 1997 to 2000.

== Biography ==
Ruiz Lizárraga was born in the Zaragoza neighborhood of Pitiquito, Sonora, and earned her law degree from the Universidad de Sonora in 1988. During this time, she served as Francisco Barbeitia Fierros' substitute deputy in the LI Legislature of the Congress of Sonora from 1985 to 1988. Ruiz Lizárraga then served as the municipal president of Pitiquito from 1994 to 1997. Finally, she was elected as a member of the LV Legislature of the Congress of Sonora via proportional representation, serving on the Justice Committee.

Her father, Ricardo Ruiz León, and her brother, Gumercindo Ruiz Lizárraga, both also served as municipal presidents of Pitiquito.
