= Valentina Gorinevskaya =

Russian military surgeon

Valentina Valentinovna Gorinevskaya
- Валетнтина Валентиновнв Гориневская
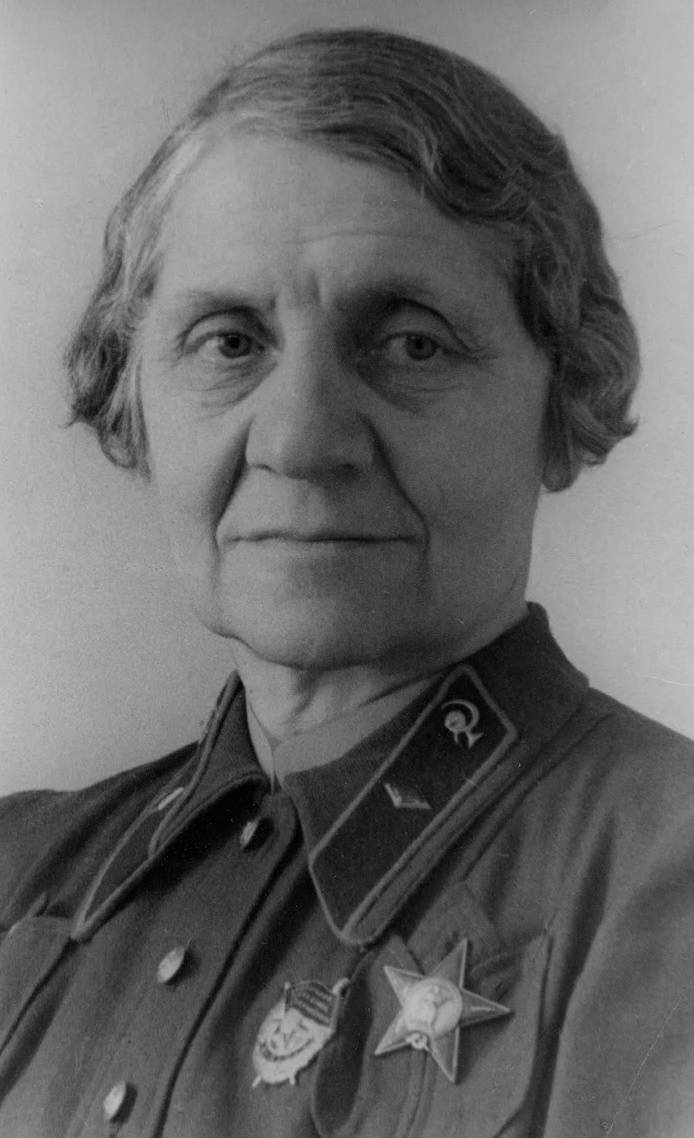
- Born: 22 January 1882
- Died: 25 September 1953 (aged 71)
- Education: St Petersburg Medical Institute for Women (M.D.)
- Scientific career
- Fields: Surgery
- Institutions: Peter and Paul Hospital; Imperial Russian Army; Workers' and Peasants' Red Army; Samara University

Valentina Gorinevskaya (Russian: Валентина Гориневская; 1882 – 1953), was a military surgeon and trauma specialist.

== Life ==
Valentina Valentinovna Gorinevskaya was born in 1882 and graduated from the St Petersburg Medical Institute for Women in 1908. She worked in the surgical clinic of Peter and Paul Hospital from 1908 to 1914. When World War I began in 1914, Gorinevskaya became the first woman to become a senior surgeon in a military hospital of the Imperial Russian Army (Russian: Ру́сская импера́торская а́рмия). "There was little fighting on the Allied eastern front in 1917, but nevertheless, hundreds of casualties had accumulated by this time in military hospitals". After the war, she became a professor of general surgery at Samara University in 1919 before moving to Moscow, where she was the head of the surgical department at the Obukh Institute. Then she became a surgeon at the Traumatological Department of the Institute of Therapy and Prosthetics professor of surgery at the Central Institute of Postgraduate Medical Training. Gorinevskaya joined the Workers' and Peasants' Red Army (Russian: Рабоче-крестьянская Красная армия (РККА) and served as the chair of field surgery in 1931–1939 and chief surgeon during the Khalkhin Gol Campaign of 1939. She served as a senior inspector of the Main Military Medical Board during World War II and died in 1953.

She died on September 25, 1953, in Moscow. She is buried in the columbarium of Novodevichy Cemetery, together with her father and sister Veronika.

== Work ==
"Gorinevskaya was one of the first Soviet surgeons to introduce the primary surgical study of wounds from industrial accidents. She pioneered traumatology as a separate branch of surgery and devised treatment in hospitals for lightly wounded soldiers. She published at least ninety books and articles, including books on traumatology, first aid, and comprehensive surgical treatment." While, "Unable to serve in the military or as government physicians were willing to endure the difficult conditions and thus found a niche for themselves as young physicians."

== See also ==
Fozil Amirov
