= Emily Zamourka =

Moldovan and American singer (born c. 1967)

- Born: Liudmila Grekova; 1967 or 1968 (age 58–59); Moldavian SSR, USSR
- Origin: Los Angeles, California, U.S.
- Genres: Opera
- Occupation: Singer
- Instruments: Vocals; violin; piano
- Years active: 2019–present

Liudmila "Emily" Zamourka (née Grekova; born c. 1967 – c. 1968) is a Moldovan and American singer and musician. She came to prominence in late September 2019, after an LAPD officer filmed and posted a video of her singing a Puccini aria at Wilshire/Normandie station of the Los Angeles Metro Rail. The video subsequently became popular over social media.

== Overview ==
In 1991, Zamourka moved from Moldova to the United States and became homeless in Los Angeles for two years when she suffered serious health problems and had to pay for her medical bills. The artist, who taught lessons in piano and violin, was forced to take up numerous jobs. She also said she ended up in the streets two or three years ago after an unknown vandal stole and destroyed her violin and with it her means of making money.

Five GoFundMe crowdfunding pages helped Zamourka get off the streets, and get her a new violin surpassed $80,000 towards the goal of $85,000. Since her subway singing, Zamourka performed at the unveiling of the Historic Little Italy sign in downtown San Pedro on Saturday October 5, 2019 before a live audience that praised her with uproarious applause. She performed there only one song: the same Puccini aria she sang on the viral video.

== Recording offer ==
On October 3, 2019, two time Grammy nominated record producer Joel Diamond publicly offered Zamourka a recording contract. Due to complications working with Zamourka, Diamond later withdrew his offer.

== See also ==
- Ted Williams
