= Valentina Crespi =

Italian-American violinist (1892– c. 1960)

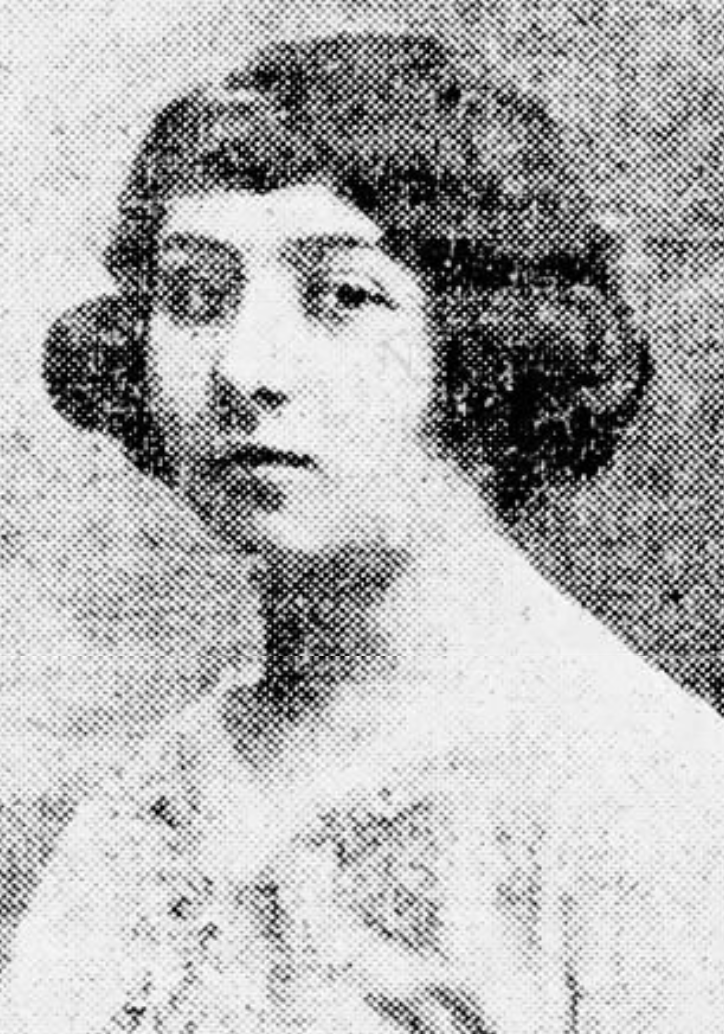
- Valentina Crespi, from a 1915 newspaper
- Born: 1892-03-14; Milan, Italy
- Died: after 1959
- Other names: Valentine Crespi, Valentina Crispi
- Occupations: Violinist, composer, violin teacher

Valentina Crespi (March 14, 1892 – after 1959) was an Italian-American violinist and composer, based in New York City in the 1910s and 1920s.

== Early life and education ==
Crespi was described as being from Milan, the daughter of Lucrezia Crespi, and a "protegee of the Queen of Roumania". She trained with Armand Parentin Paris, and with Jenő Hubay in Budapest.

== Career ==
Crespi was a "celebrated violinist" who toured in the United States, Canada, and Europe. She played Tchaikovsky's Violin Concerto in D at the Promenade Concerts in London in 1912. "Her technique is excellent and she gave the work with intelligence and artistic insight of no small order for a young violinist", reported the Musical News of her Proms appearance. She also played at Bechstein Hall in 1912 and 1914. In 1914, a British collector gave Crespi a manuscript of a "secret exercise" written by Niccolò Paganini, along with a letter in Paganini's hand.

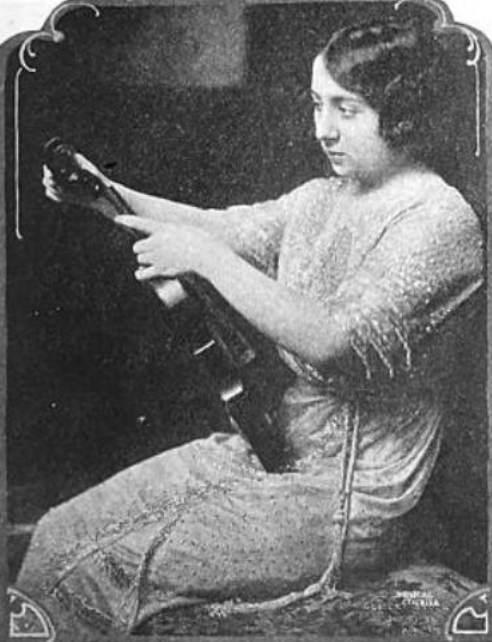
Valentina Crespi with her violin, from a 1917 publication

Crespi lived in New York City in the 1910s and 1920s. She performed at a "socialst musical festival" in Carnegie Hall in 1914. She gave concerts in Maine and Michigan in 1915. In 1916 she played at a benefit for the Italian Red Cross the Biltmore Hotel, and for the Humanitarian Cult at Carnegie Hall. In March 1919, she was part of the musical ensemble for an Irish music festival at the Brooklyn Academy of Music. In late 1921, she performed at New York's Aeolian Hall, and in a radio concert. She toured American Midwestern states in 1922 and 1923, and at the University of South Dakota in 1927. One of her last American performances was for the Mozart Verein in Port Chester, New York, late in 1929.

== Publications ==
Crespi was also a composer, who wrote music to accompany silent films, and published musical compositions, including:

- "Steluta" and "Variations on a Roumanian Air" (1915)
- Frills and Furbelows (1917)
- Thoughts (No. 35) (1917)
- Memories (No. 50) (1917)
- Serenata (No. 105) (1917)

== Personal life ==
Crespi spent the summer of 1922 in Rigi Kaltbad, Switzerland with her American accompanist, Susie Kirk-Schneider, and the two young Kirk-Schneider children. Crespi became a naturalized United States citizen in 1925. She moved to Switzerland with Kirk-Schneider in 1930. On Christmas night in 1939, she was shot and seriously wounded by Kirk-Schneider's 23-year-old son, known as Robert Kirk, at their home in Sainte-Croix, Switzerland.

When Susie Kirk died in Switzerland in 1960, from cancer, Valentine Crespi inherited Kirk's jewelry, cars, horses, cattle, and Swiss dairy farm. She owned a 1699 Stradivarius, known as the Crespi; it was sold to the Fridart Foundation in Geneva in 1960. In October 2025, the Crespi violin was loaned to Australian musician Christian Li.
