= Trifon Grekov =

Macedonian emigrant political activist

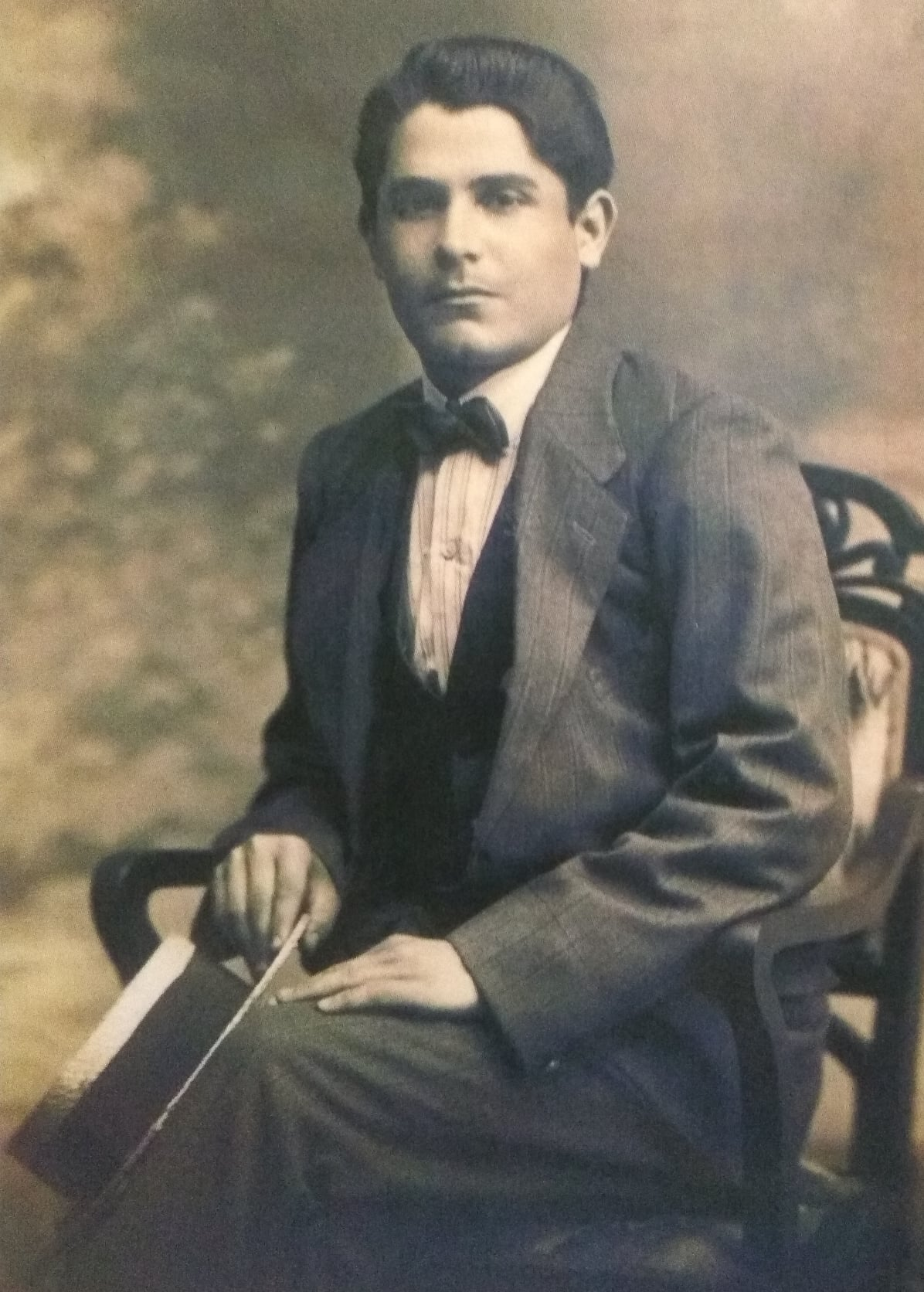
- Born: August 1, 1893; Yenice-i Vardar, Ottoman Empire
- Died: June 9, 1973; Gevgelija, SFR Yugoslavia
- Education: University of Geneva

Trifon Kostadinov Grekov (Bulgarian: Трифон Костадинов Греков; 1893 – 1973) or Trifun Grekovski (Macedonian: Трифун Грековски), also known as Trifun Greković (Serbian: Трифун Грековић), was a Macedonian physician, emigrant political activist during and after the First World War and Macedonian Partisan during the Second World War.

== Biography ==
Trifon, also known as Trpche Grkov (Bulgarian: Тръпче Гърков), was born in the Ottoman town of Yenice Vardar, today Giannitsa, Greece. His father was one of the prominent Bulgarians in the town and a member of the Internal Macedonian-Adrianople Revolutionary Organization. Others in the family were also members of the IMARO.

He graduated from the Bulgarian Men's High School in Thessaloniki in 1913 and left for Switzerland during the Second Balkan War. He settled in Geneva, where from 1914 to 1920 he studied at the Faculty of Medicine. Together with other Macedonian students, he founded the Academic Society Macedonia. After graduating, he stayed in Switzerland, where he worked as a physician.

In Geneva, Grekov was a member of the International Bureau for the Defense of Indigenous Peoples and secretary of a commission of this bureau for Macedonia. In June 1921, he handed a petition to Helmer Rosting from the Secretariat of the League of Nations, who welcomed it as informing. He sent a congratulatory telegram to the founding congress of the Macedonian Federative Emigrant Organization, held in December 1921 in Sofia, Bulgaria, and joined this organization and wrote several articles in its organ Autonomous Macedonia. He also traveled to Lausanne, where an international conference was held in late 1922 and early 1923, with the aim of presenting the Macedonian question. For this purpose, he managed to meet Italian, American and English representatives in Lausanne. He was also part of a group of federalists who gathered in Vienna in late 1923 and early 1924 and formed a legal department of the organization. This group started publishing the newspaper Macedonian Consciousness, in which Grekov published his essay entitled A Brief History of Macedonia during 1924.

In the mid-1920s he returned to the region of Macedonia and settled in Gevgelija, then in the Kingdom of Serbs, Croats and Slovenes (later Yugoslavia), where he worked as a physician and was the only one in the city. He gave a speech on a demonstration organized by the authorities in Gevgelija, which protested against the policy of assimilation of the "Serbian minority" in Greece, i.e. the Macedonian Slavs as viewed by Belgrade. In 1936, the young doctor Dimitar Micev began his career in Gevgelija and helped Grekov in covering the entire population of the city, as well as the towns and villages in the vicinity, including Valandovo, Bogdanci, Dojran and Miravci. During World War II in Yugoslav Macedonia, Grekov was mobilized as a military doctor in the Bulgarian Army in Bitola and Kumanovo.

In mid-August 1944, he deserted and moved to the Partisan-controlled village of Žegljane, located in a hilly area northeast of Kumanovo, where he established a shelter for wounded and sick partisans. Until the end of the war, he worked at the partisan hospital in the Prohor Pčinjski Monastery. In 1945, when Macedonia became one of the republics of Socialist Yugoslavia, he was sent to Bitola to organize the health service. In 1951, he was transferred to work in Veles. Grekovski returned to Gevgelija in 1954 and worked there as a physician until his retirement in 1962. He died in Gevgelija in 1973.

== Views ==
Grekov's proposal for a flag of a future state of Macedonia: black and red placed parallel lengthwise.

In the first half of the 1920s, Grekov self-identified as a Macedonian Bulgarian, but taking into account that Macedonia was inhabited by people from different ethnic and religious backgrounds, and that since 1913 it was divided between Greece and Serbia, which had an aggressive policy of assimilation of the local population, he considered that posing the Macedonian question as a Bulgarian question has already proven to be harmful and instead he thought that the solution is the region of Macedonia becoming a state, independent from the neighboring Balkan states, including from Bulgaria.

In that regard, he wrote a draft constitution of a future Independent Macedonia, based on the Swiss constitution, emphasizing the diversity of this Western European country as resembling Macedonia's case, and therefore he advocated for the Switzerland of the Balkans concept, i.e. uniting Macedonians into a state despite their ethnic and religious differences. Contributing to the cause for Independent Macedonia, he wrote an article about the symbols of such a future state. He traced continuity of the modern Macedonians with Alexander the Great and Cyril and Methodius, historical figures originating from the region of Macedonia.
