= Valentina Borisovna Grekova =

Soviet Russian art and building restorer (1931–2019)

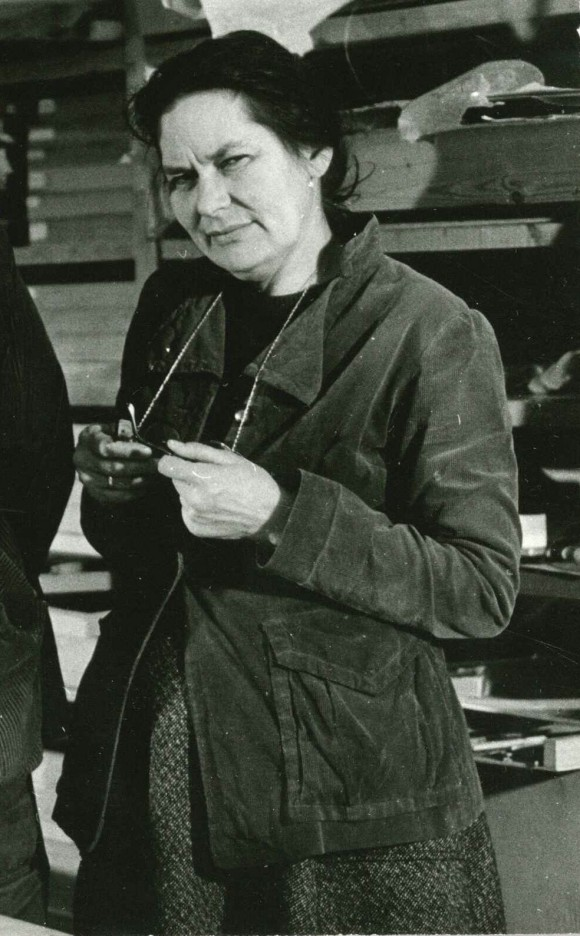
Valentina Borisovna Grekova

Valentina Borisovna Grekova (Russian: Валентина Борисовна Грекова, née Valentina Borisovna Rosenfeld; 6 May 1931 – 2 April 2019) was a Soviet Russian art and building restorer. She was awarded the USSR State Prize.

== Early life and education ==
Valentina Borisovna Grekova was born on 6 May 1931, in Samara, Soviet Union. Grekova's father taught at the Moscow State Pedagogical Institute and was arrested and shot during the Great Terror.

In 1950, she began her studies at Moscow State University, in the evening department of art studies at the Faculty of History (graduating with honors in 1956). In her third year, she began working in the architecture group of the Central Scientific Restoration Workshop. In her final year, in 1955, she first came to Novgorod to participate in the work to secure the foundation of the Paraskeva Church in the Yaroslav Courtyard and worked on the painting of St. Sophia Cathedral.

== Career ==
From 1962 onwards, Grekova worked for the Soyuzrestavraziya association and restored architectural monuments and paintings of national importance, such as the Savva Monastery in Zvenigorod, the wooden churches of Kizhi Pogost, and the Petrovsk Palace.

After a special commission of the Ministry of Culture decided in 1963 to begin excavating the Church of the Transfiguration of the Lord on Kovalyov Hill ( the Katholikon of the former monastery near Novgorod), which had been destroyed in World War II, and to preserve the remains of the church's frescoes dating from 1380.

That same year, she met her future husband, the restorer Alexander Grekov (1909–2000), there. In the spring of 1965, they were back together at the Church of the Transfiguration of the Savior at Kovalevo (1380). The work was so interesting and important that they continued to be involved. They worked together, reported and published together, and jointly organized the exhibitions of the salvaged frescoes. The Grekovs developed a unique method for rescuing frescoes from war-damaged architectural monuments. The fragments were sorted according to their original positions, arranged in groups, and restored section by section. They directed the restoration work on the frescoes of the church on Kovalyov for more than 35 years. A new Church of the Transfiguration of the Lord was built on Kovalyov between 1970 and 1974, based on a design by the architect and restorer Leonid Krasnorechyev, and the restored frescoes were installed there. After her husband's death, she took over the management of the restoration workshop and continued the work.

Grebova died on 2 April 2019, in Veliky Novgorod, Russia, and was buried next to her husband in the cemetery of the monastery in Chutin on the right bank of the Volkhov River north of Veliky Novgorod.
