= Mortier de 15 de Vallière =

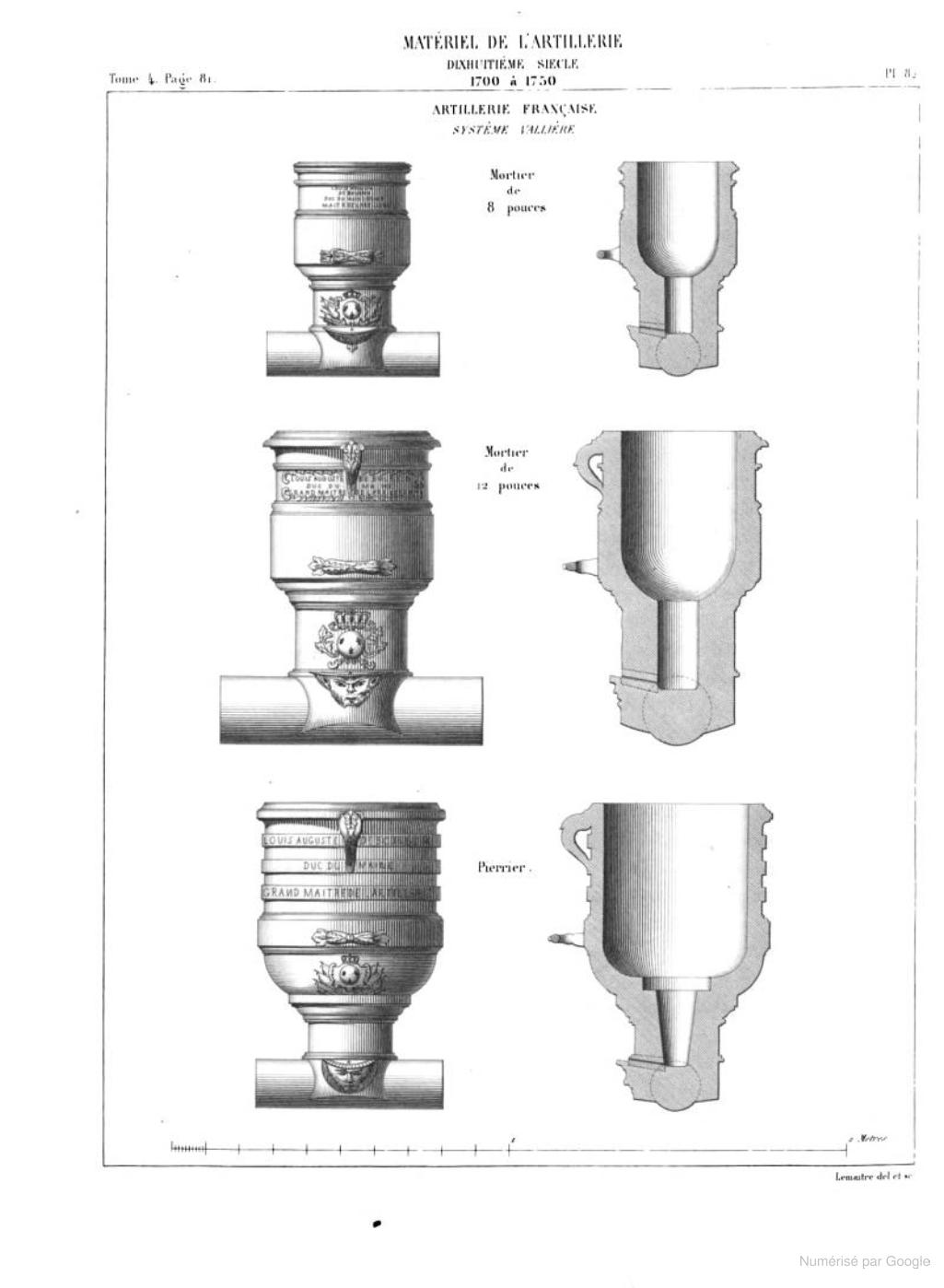
- 15-pouce stone-throwing (pierrier) mortar (bottom)
- Type: Artillery
- Place of origin: Kingdom of France

Service history
- In service: 1732–1756, 1772–1774
- Used by: Kingdom of France; United States
- Wars: War of the Polish Succession; War of the Austrian Succession; Seven Years' War

Production history
- Designer: Jean-Florent de Vallière
- Designed: 1732

Specifications
- Mass: 289 kg (637 lb)
- Caliber: 406.05 mm (15.99 in)

The Mortier de 15 de Vallière was a type of mortar designed by the French officer Jean-Florent de Vallière (1667–1759), Director-General of the Battalions and Schools of the Artillery. The 15-pouce (a French inch) mortar was designed to hurl stones rather than bombs, making it an anti-personnel weapon. The mortar was part of the Vallière system which was established in 1732. The new system reduced the variety of cannons to five calibers and the number of mortars to three calibers, standardized their production, and manufactured all new artillery pieces in France.

== Vallière system ==
Jean-Florent de Vallière was a French Royal Army veteran who served in 60 sieges and 10 battles. In 1726 he was appointed Director General of Artillery. The French guns of that era included artillery pieces that were manufactured in different countries and employed a range of various calibers. Keeping track of the different ammunition sizes was a logistical headache. On 7 October 1732, the Vallière system replaced all earlier artillery systems used by the French Royal Army. Its purpose was to reduce the number of calibers, standardize the production of the new gun barrels, and manufacture all its artillery pieces in France. The system successfully met these goals. The Vallière cannons were well designed and accurate. The Vallière system artillery included 24-pounder, 16-pounder, 12-pounder, 8-pounder and 4-pounder cannons, mortars of 12-pouce and 8-pouce, and stone-throwing (pierrier) mortars of 15-pouce.

A mortar was an artillery piece that threw an explosive projectile or stone on a high arc into enemy fortifications. A mortar was usually of short length and large caliber. It lacked wheels and was used during sieges. The Vallière guns performed well in siege warfare but proved disappointing as field artillery. Vallière believed it was foolish to make different cannons for siege and field artillery. In the War of the Austrian Succession (1740–1748) it was discovered that the new guns were appropriate for sieges, but the great weight of the 4-, 8-, and 12-pounder guns made them unsuitable for use as field artillery. To address this problem, the French manufactured some lighter 4-pounder cannons copied from a Swedish design.

During the Seven Years' War (1756–1763) the French artillery was at a serious disadvantage when facing lighter Prussian and British cannons. As a remedy, the so-called Swedish 4-pounders were again produced and employed as battalion guns. Before the war, Austria implemented the Liechtenstein artillery system which greatly improved its cannons. Even Russia introduced reforms for its obsolete cannons with the Shuvalov artillery system in 1757. Meanwhile, Vallière was succeeded by his son Joseph as Director General of Artillery. In 1761, King Louis XV's War Minister Étienne François de Choiseul, Duke of Choiseul sent Joseph de Vallière to review the Kingdom of Spain's artillery. With the younger Vallière out of the way, Choiseul authorized Jean-Baptiste Vaquette de Gribeauval to conduct a series of tests at Strasbourg in 1765. The tests showed Gribeauval's much lighter guns could shoot just as far as the old Vallière guns. On 17 August 1765, the Vallière system was replaced by the Gribeauval system.

== Specifications ==
Note that pouce is a French inch equal to 27.07 mm (1.066 in), so that 15-pouce equals 406.05 mm (15.99 in). The livre or French pound equals 0.48941 kg (1.08 lb). The 15-pouce mortar weighed 1,000 livres or 489.41 kg (1,079 lb) and required 2.5 livres or 1.223525 kg (2.7 lb) of gunpowder to launch its stone. The pierrier mortar required a crew of three. One crew member placed the gunpowder and rammed it down with three blows. Two wads were placed atop the powder and rammed down with nine blows. The projectiles were held in place by tamped earth or dung. The stone missiles were held in baskets 15-inches wide and 20-inches deep. The vent was primed with gunpowder and ignited by a linstock. When fired, the stones scattered with the object of injuring or killing enemy personnel.

== Gallery ==
15-pouce Vallière pierrier stone-throwing mortar
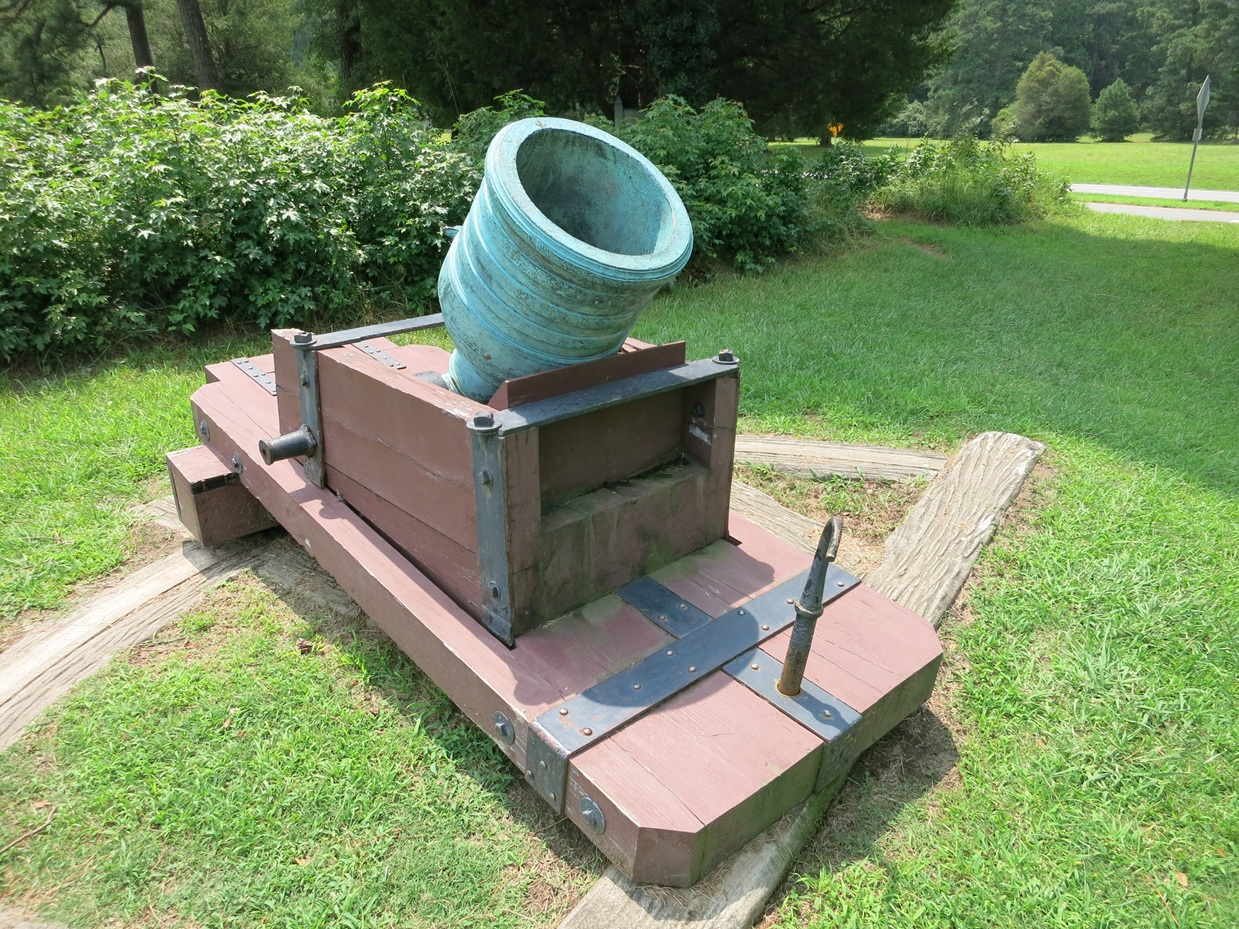
15-pouce Vallière pierrier mortar at Yorktown Battlefield, front view

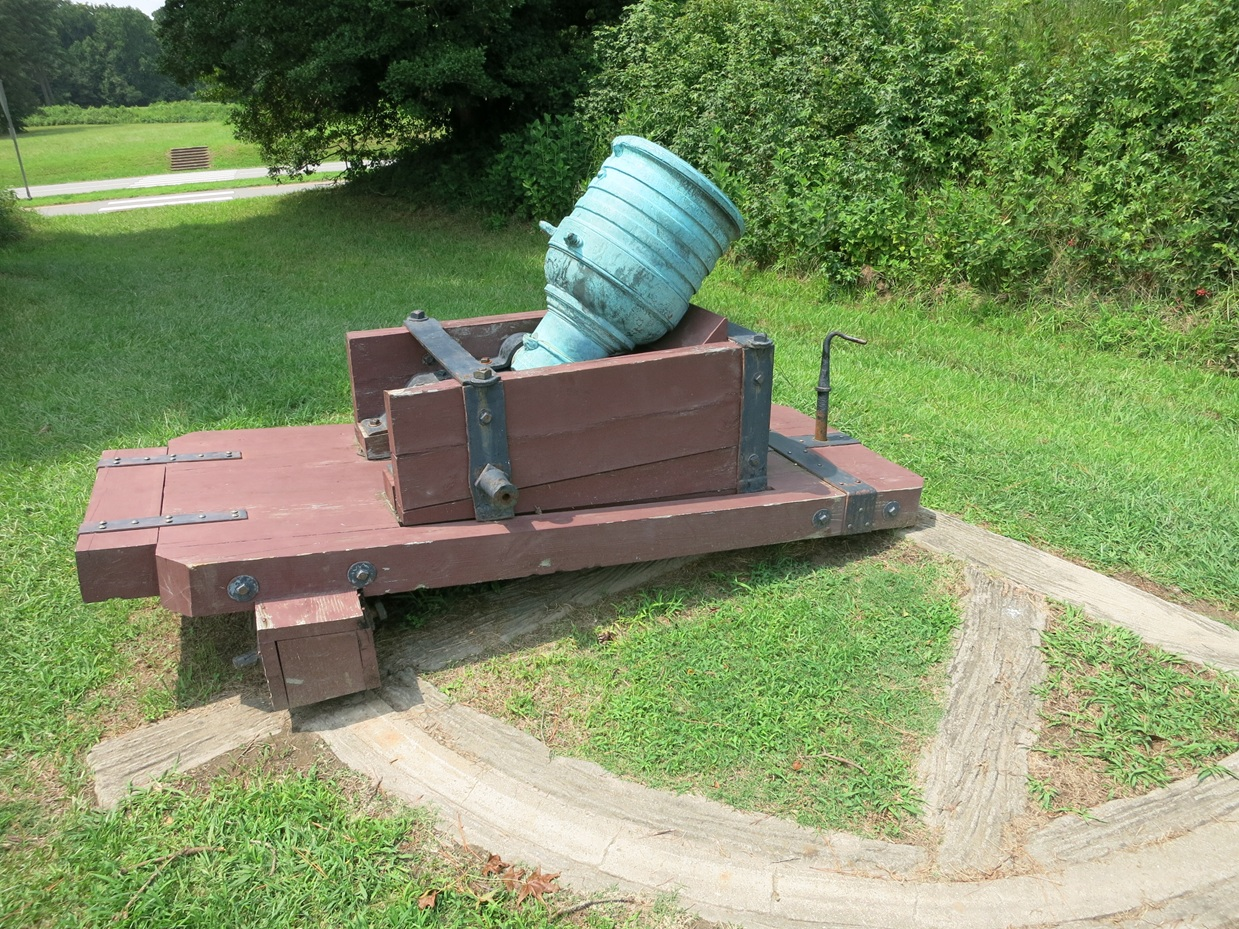
15-pouce Vallière pierrier mortar at Yorktown Battlefield, side view

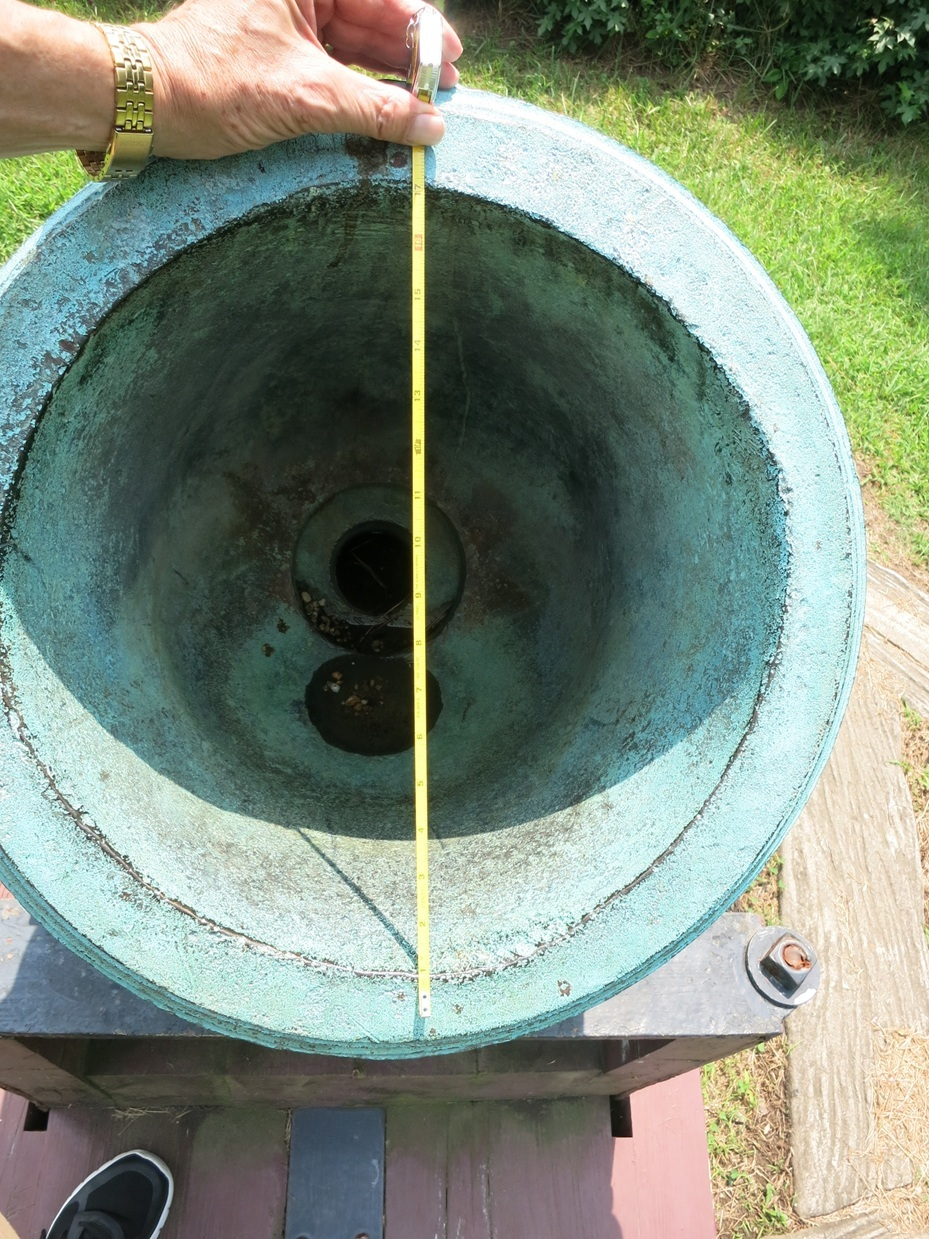
15-pouce Vallière pierrier mortar, measuring tape shows 16-inch bore

== History ==
When Joseph de Vallière returned from Spain, he found that he had been replaced as Director General by Gribeauval. At first, he lobbied intensely but unsuccessfully to reinstate his father's system. After Choiseul was replaced, a new minister of war reappointed Joseph de Vallière as Director General of Artillery in June 1772. By this time, 1,200 new 4-pounder, 8-pounder, and 12-pounder Gribeauval guns had been cast and the cost to melt them down and recast them was prohibitive. However, the Vallière 24-pounder and 16-pounder siege guns and mortars were still available. Joseph de Vallière's tenure was short; the Gribeauval system was reinstated on 3 October 1774.

During the American Revolutionary War, a French corps under the command of Jean-Baptiste Donatien de Vimeur, comte de Rochambeau marched together with American forces under George Washington from the area near New York City to the south to carry out the Siege of Yorktown in 1781. There the allies were joined by a second French corps under Claude-Anne de Rouvroy de Saint Simon which disembarked from a French fleet led by François Joseph Paul de Grasse. While Rochambeau's corps was equipped with thirty Gribeauval field guns, Saint Simon's corps was largely armed with Vallière artillery. There were twelve 24-pounders, eight 16-pounders, seven 12-pouce mortars, four 8-pouce mortars, and two 8-pouce howitzers. The only pieces of Saint Simon's that were not Vallière guns were twelve Rostaing 1-pounders and eight Swedish 4-pounders. (Note: Note that no 15-pouce mortars are listed. However, the presence of the mortar in the USA suggests that it was employed at Yorktown or at some other location during the American Revolutionary War.)

== Notes ==
Footnotes

Citations
