= Obusier de 8 Vallière =

Obusier de 8 de Vallière
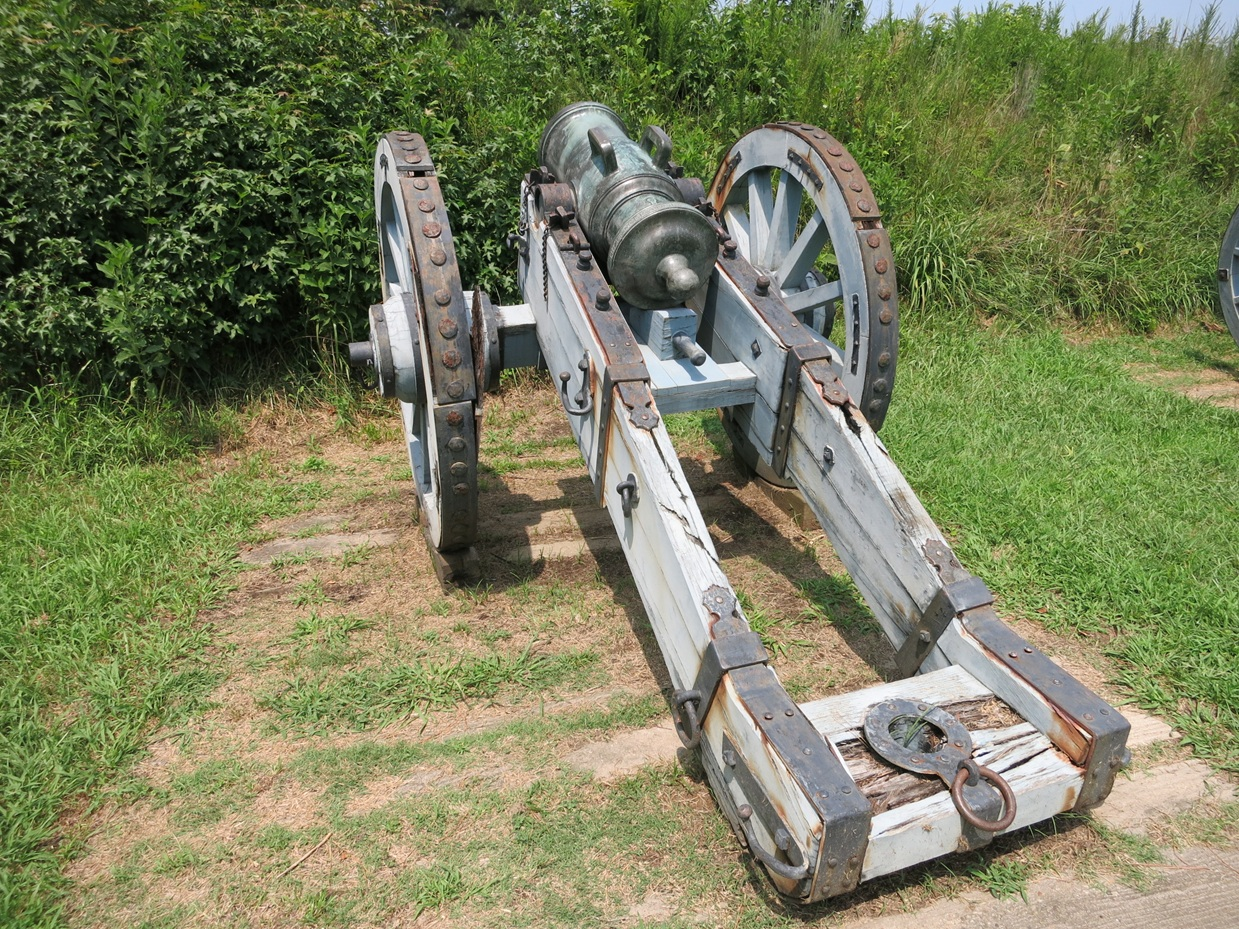
- Vallière 8-pouce howitzer at Yorktown, Virginia.
- Type: Artillery
- Place of origin: Kingdom of France

Service history
- In service: 1749–1781
- Used by: Kingdom of France; United States
- Wars: Seven Years' War; American Revolutionary War

Production history
- Designer: Joseph-Florent de Vallière
- Designed: 1773

Specifications
- Shell: Common shell
- Caliber: 216.55 mm (8.526 in)
- Rate of fire: 1 shot per minute

The Obusier de 8 de Vallière was a type of howitzer designed by the French officer Joseph-Florent de Vallière, Director-General of the Battalions and Schools of the Artillery. The 8-pouce howitzer was a late addition to the Vallière system which was established in 1732 with the intention of reducing the variety of cannons to five calibers and the types of mortars to three calibers, of standardizing their production, and of manufacturing all new artillery pieces in France.

Note that a pouce or French inch is equal to 27.07 mm (1.066 in). Therefore, 8-pouce equals 216.55 mm (8.526 in). A French pound (livre) was equal to 489.41 g (1.079 lb) while an English pound was equal to 453.6 g.

== Vallière system ==
Jean-Florent de Vallière served in 60 sieges and 10 battles during his career in the French Royal Army. In 1726, he was appointed Director General of Artillery. On 7 October 1732, what came to be known as the Vallière system replaced all previous artillery systems employed by the French Royal Army. The system successfully met its goals to reduce the number of calibers, standardize the production of new gun barrels, and manufacture all its artillery pieces in France. The Vallière cannons were well designed and accurate. The Vallière system artillery included 24-pounder, 16-pounder, 12-pounder, 8-pounder and 4-pounder cannons, mortars of 12-pouce and 8-pouce, and stone-throwing (pierrier) mortars of 15-pouce. Since Vallière had extensive siege experience, he believed that creating separate field artillery and siege guns was foolish. All Vallière guns were suitable for siege work, which meant that their large weight made them unwieldy for field operations.

One shortcoming that appeared during the War of the Austrian Succession (1740–1748) was the Vallière system's lack of a howitzer. When French officers insisted that a howitzer be produced, they were at first opposed by Vallière's son Joseph-Florent de Vallière (1717–1776) who became commander of the artillery school in 1747. Joseph de Vallière finally designed the 8-inch howitzer in 1749, but not many were manufactured.

On 15 October 1765, based on the results of tests conducted at Strasbourg, King Louis XV and his War Minister Étienne François de Choiseul, Duke of Choiseul authorized the Gribeauval system to be implemented. This was done secretly in order to conceal it from foreign agents and reactionary French officers. The new system's field artillery included 4-pounder, 8-pounder, and 12-pounder guns as well as a 6-inch howitzer and a 1-pounder Rostaing gun. Joseph de Vallière was reappointed Director-General of Artillery in 1772, bringing back the obsolete Vallière system. By this time, the older Vallière siege guns were still being used, but 1,200 of the new Gribeauval guns had been manufactured and equipped with gun carriages and caissons. Because the cost to recast the existing Gribeauval guns would have been exorbitant, this was never done. In any case, on 3 October 1774 the Gribeauval system was reinstated.

== Howitzer specifications ==
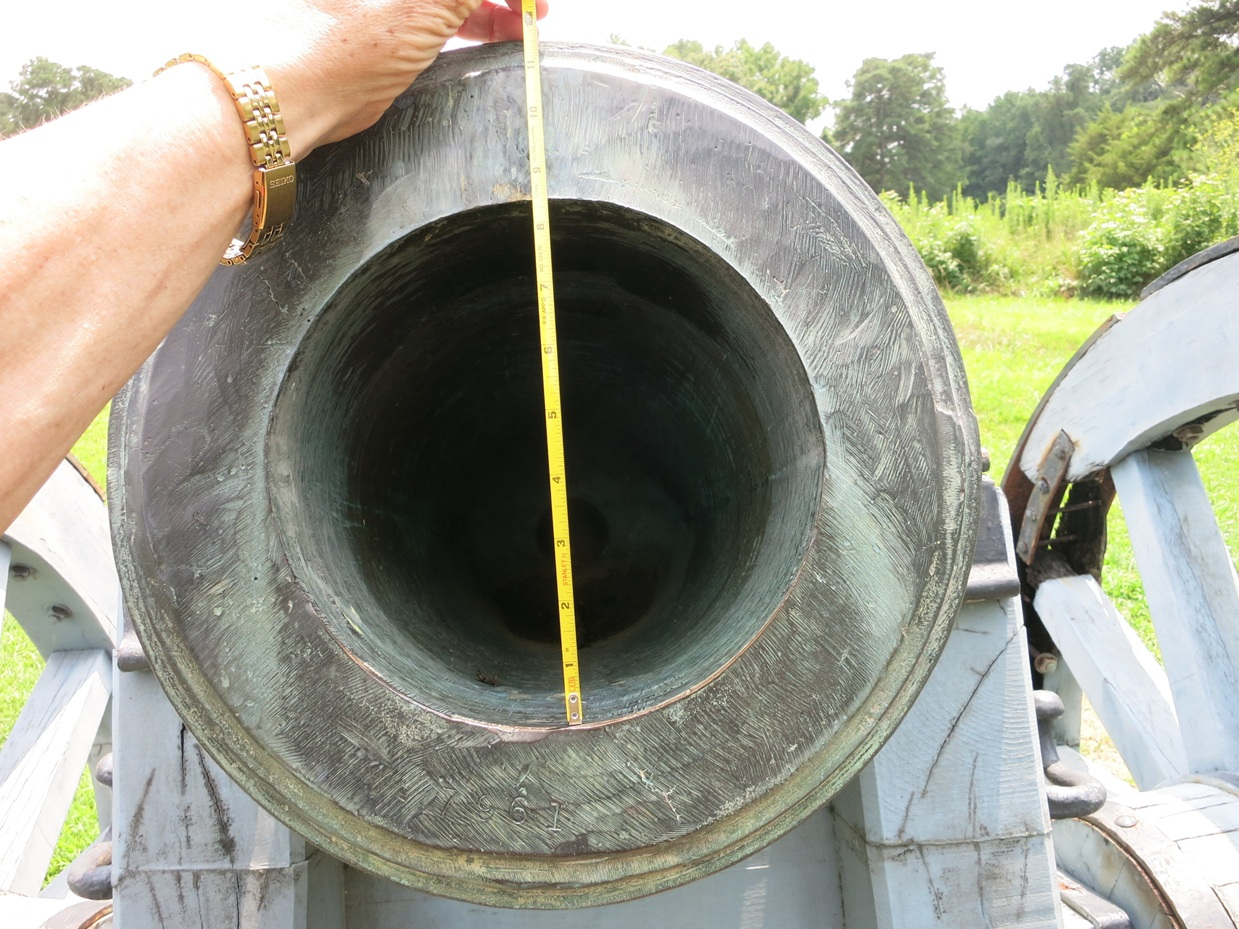
Caliber of a Vallière 8-pouce howitzer is about 8.5 English inches.

A howitzer was a short-barrelled artillery piece used to fire a shell at a higher angle than a cannon. Since it was lighter than a mortar, a howitzer was mounted on a gun carriage which made it possible to be employed as field artillery. Howitzers and mortars fired a shell (also called a bomb) that consisted of a hollow iron ball filled with gunpowder with a fuse. When the lit fuse burned down, it exploded the shell which burst into as many as 25 pieces. Howitzers were also capable of firing canister shot.

Usually, a crew of five served each howitzer, with two fire-workers and three assistants. After a round was fired, a crew member closed the vent. The gunpowder charge (loose powder or linen cartridge) was placed in the tube and rammed home with three blows. Then, a wad was inserted into the tube and rammed home with nine more blows. The shell was placed in the tube with the fuse facing outward and wedged in place with earth. The howitzer was aimed and elevated. The vent was uncovered and fuse was lit, followed immediately by lighting the charge via the vent. At a later date, the blast of firing was expected to ignite the fuse. Sustained rate of fire for a howitzer was about one round per minute.

== American campaign ==
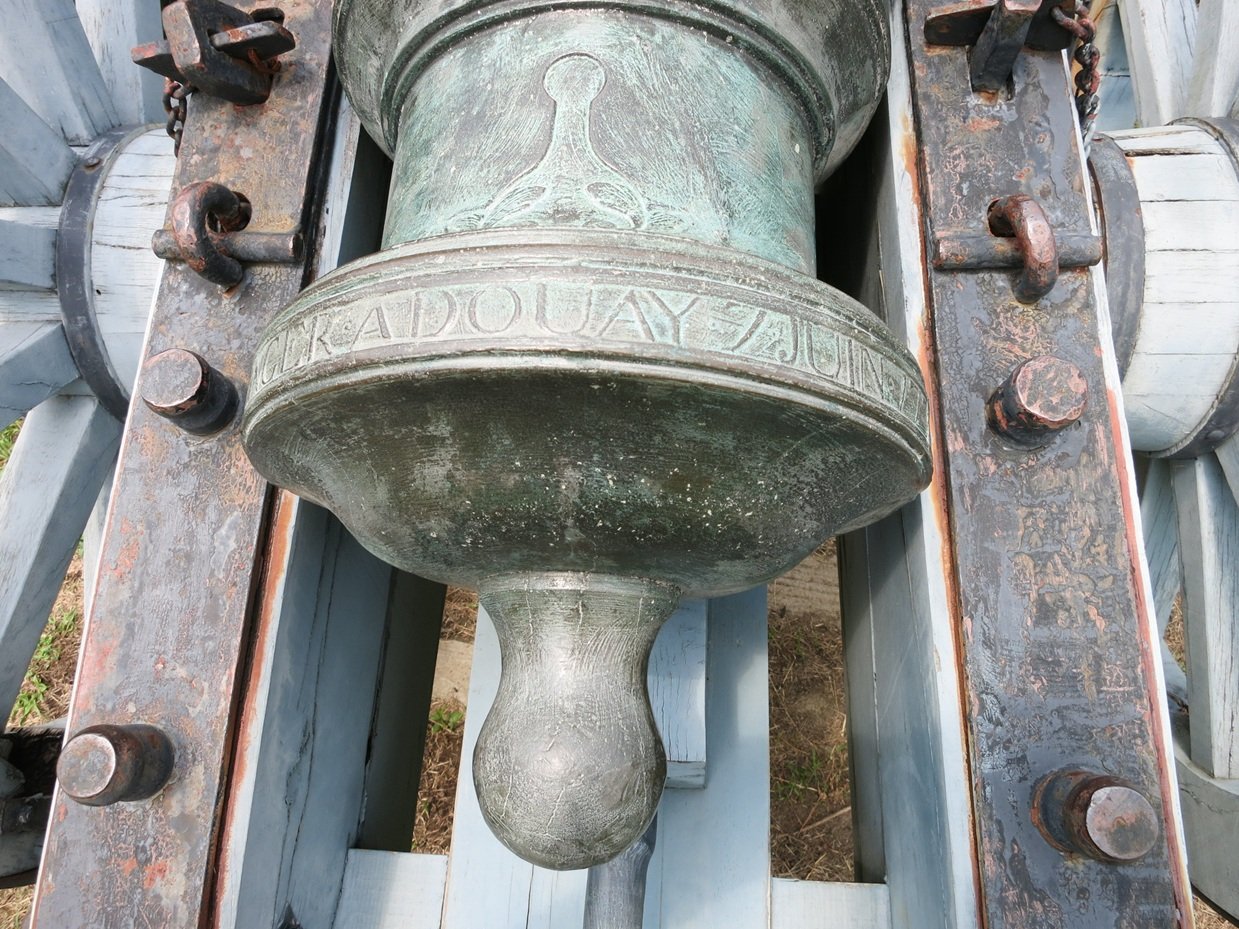
Breech of a Vallière 8-pouce howitzer made at Douay arsenal in 1770s.

In 1781, a French corps under the command of Jean-Baptiste Donatien de Vimeur, comte de Rochambeau marched together with American forces under Washington from near New York City to Williamsburg, Virginia. There the allies were joined by a second French corps led by Claude-Anne de Rouvroy de Saint Simon which was landed from the French fleet under François Joseph Paul de Grasse. The two forces carried out the successful Siege of Yorktown. Rochambeau's corps was equipped with eight 12-pounders, sixteen 4-pounders, and six 6-inch howitzers, all Gribeauval system guns. Saint Simon's corps was armed with mostly Vallière guns. There were twelve 24-pounders, eight 16-pounders, seven 12-pouce mortars, four 8-pouce mortars, and two 8-pouce howitzers. The only pieces of Saint Simon's that were not Vallière guns were eight Swedish 4-pounders and twelve Rostaing 1-pounders.

During the Siege of Yorktown, two howitzers were emplaced in the Grand French Battery Complex which was part of the first parallel. The complex included four separated batteries located near the intersection of the Hampton and Goosley Roads. The right-hand (most easterly) battery of the complex contained eight 16-pounders, four mortars of unspecified caliber, and two howitzers. The remaining structures of the Grand French Battery contained eight 24-pounders, three 12-pouce and five 8-pouce mortars.
