= François Frézeau de La Frézelière =

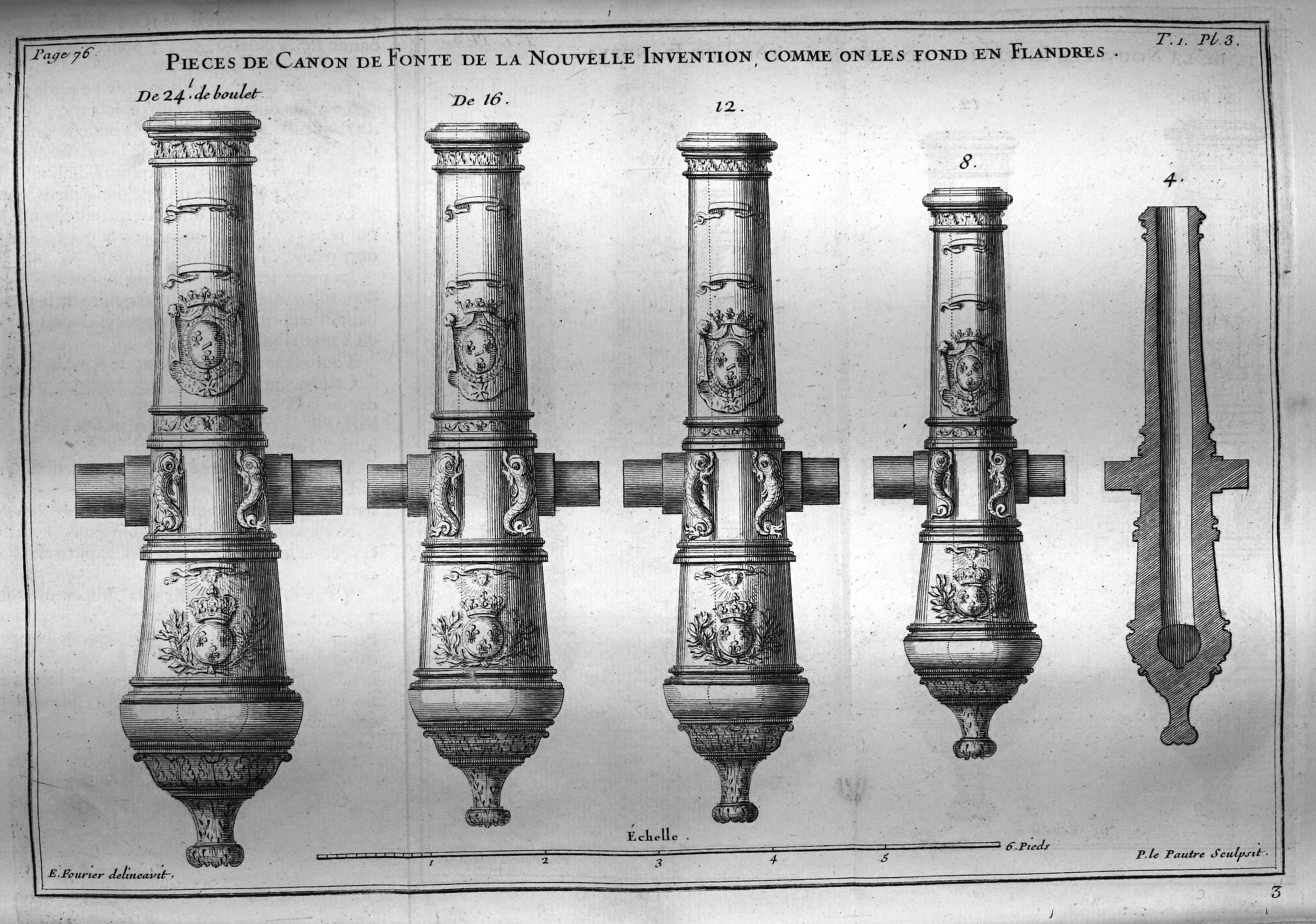
- Cannons of La Nouvelle Invention
- Born: 10 June 1623
- Died: 3 May 1702 (aged 78)
- Allegiance: Kingdom of France
- Branch: Artillery
- Rank: Lieutenant General
- Conflicts: Franco-Dutch War (1672–1678); War of the Reunions (1683–1684); Nine Years' War (1688–1697)
- Awards: Order of Saint Louis

François Frézeau de La Frézelière (10 June 1623 – 3 May 1702) designed a new system of artillery in the late 1600s where the cannons were of considerably lighter weight than contemporary guns. Frézelière's Artillerie de Nouvelle Invention (Artillery of the New Invention) was ahead of its time but suffered from unresolved recoil and other problems. His effort to introduce light field artillery into the French Royal Army was strenuously opposed by conservative artillery officers. The system was suppressed in 1720 and eventually replaced by the Vallière system of heavier cannons.

== Family ==
François Frézeau de La Frézelière was born into the noble Frézeau de La Frézelière family. From 1651, the family's residence was the chateau at Monts-sur-Guesnes. The family produced many soldiers during the wars of the 16th century and 17th century. Many of these soldiers were especially proficient in the handling of artillery, including François Frézeau de La Frézelière who was promoted to Lieutenant General. Frézelière's son Charles-Madeleine Frézeau de la Frézelière (4 September 1654 – 4 November 1702) became the colonel of the Frézelière Dragoon Regiment and resigned from the army in 1679. He studied at the College of Sorbonne, became a Jesuit, and ultimately became the Bishop of La Rochelle on 27 June 1694.

== Old French cannons ==
By the 1690s, French cannons were produced in the following classes according to the weight of the round shot they fired: 33-pounder, 24-pounder, 16-pounder, 12-pounder, 8-pounder, and 4-pounder. Each of these were produced in three types. Doubly-fortified used the thickest metal and fired a gunpowder charge equal in weight to the round shot. Legitimate used metal of middling thickness and fired a charge four-fifths the weight of the shot. Bastard used the thinnest metal and fired a charge two-thirds the weight of the shot. Gun barrels were designed to protrude from a fortified embrasure, so that they were all 10 or 11 ft (3.0 or 3.4 m) long. A shorter gun barrel could cause damage to the fortification when the cannon fired. The problem was that the long gun barrels made even the smaller caliber cannons very heavy, making them difficult to use as field artillery.

== Artillerie de Nouvelle Invention ==
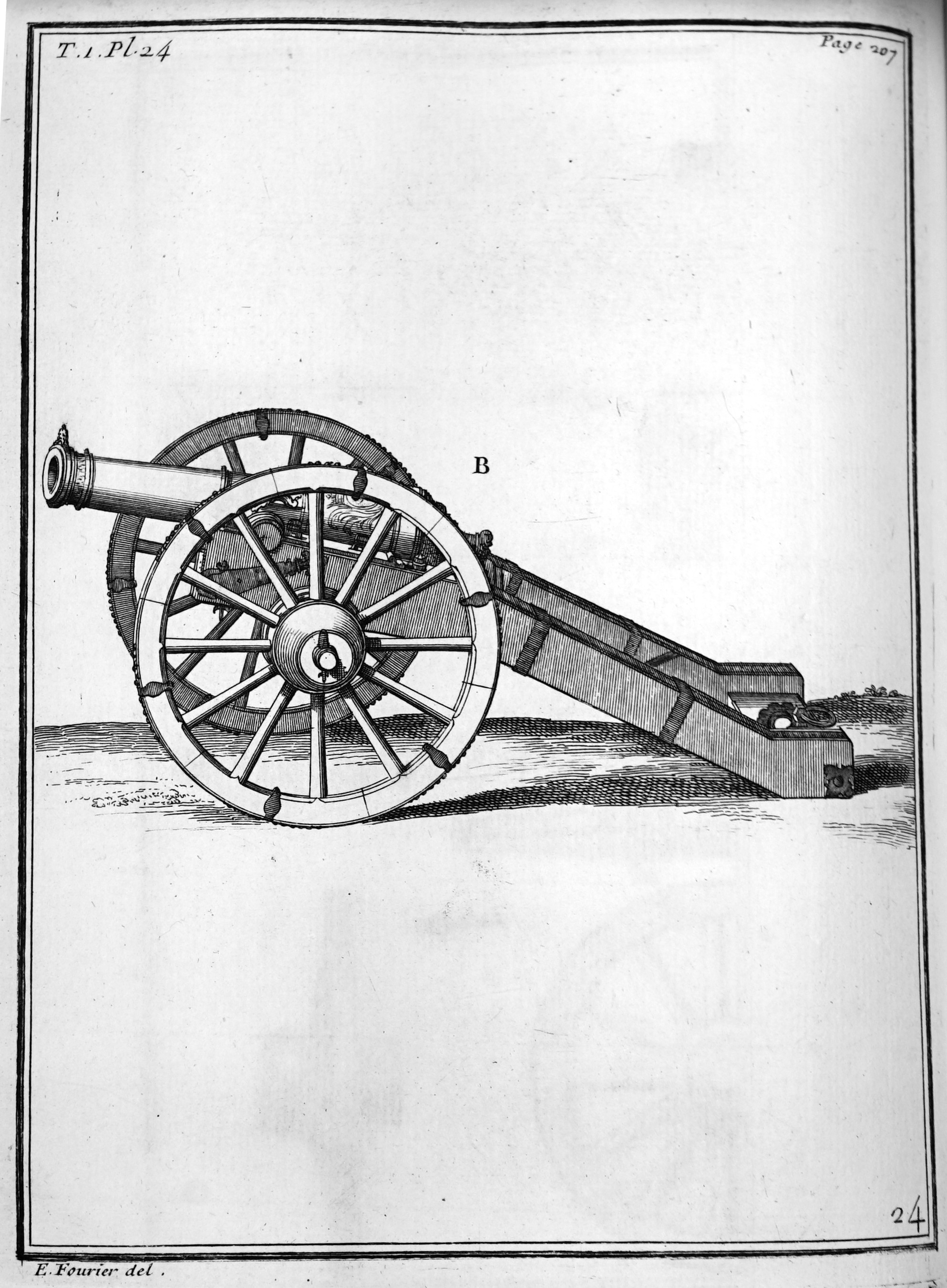
A 12-pounder cannon of the Nouvelle Invention shown mounted on its gun carriage.

The Spanish gunner Antonio Gonzales developed a light artillery system in 1679. Gonzales did this by producing cannons with a spherical powder chamber. The spherical chamber allowed the gunpowder charge to burn faster and detonate more violently. The new configuration allowed the gunpowder charge to be reduced from two-thirds of the weight of the round shot to one-third of the weight. Because the charge was reduced, the cannon's weight could be significantly decreased without causing the gun to burst. Though the charge was reduced, it was found that the round shot retained the same penetrating power as the shot fired with the heavier charge. The new 4-pounder was almost the same weight as Lennart Torstensson's Swedish cast iron guns from the Thirty Years' War. Frézelière liked the idea and incorporated Gonzales' lighter cannons into the Artillerie de Nouvelle Invention, though the system was never officially accepted.

The cannons of the Nouvelle Invention were lighter but they suffered from a recoil problem. The more powerful explosion of the gunpowder charge caused severe damage to the existing gun carriages. Another problem was that the larger gun chamber could not be properly swabbed out with a wet rammer. This meant that still-burning material might still be inside the chamber. Any attempt to load more gunpowder could cause a premature detonation, causing severe injury or death to the man loading the gun. Finally, the shorter gun barrels meant that firing the cannons caused damage to the fortifications.

Frézelière tried to overcome all these problems. He experimented with a pear-shaped chamber, but this did not solve the problem. He produced cannons with slightly longer gun barrels. He built sturdier gun carriages and better gun trails, but they were still not satisfactory. He melted down the old culverins in the fortresses on the eastern frontier of France and founded new cannons of the Nouvelle Invention. The conservative artillery officers strenuously opposed these reforms and after Frézelière's death all the Nouvelle Invention cannons were recast as longer and heavier artillery pieces.

In 1720, the Artillerie de Nouvelle Invention was suppressed. In 1732, the Vallière system was introduced by Jean-Florent de Vallière. It standardized the calibers of all French cannons into 24-pounders, 16-pounders, 12-pounders, 8-pounders, and 4-pounders. Unfortunately, the smaller calibers were too heavy to be efficiently used as field artillery.

== Specifications ==
Characteristics: Nouvelle Invention vs. Vallière system artillery pieces
System	Caliber	Tube Weight kg (lb)	Tube Length m (ft)	Shot Weight kg (lb)
Nouvelle Invention	4-pounder	293 (646)	1.54 (5.1)	2 (4.4)
Nouvelle Invention	8-pounder	489 (1,078)	1.62 (5.3)	4 (8.8)
Nouvelle Invention	12-pounder	978 (2,156)	1.98 (6.5)	6 (13.2)
Nouvelle Invention	16-pounder	1,076 (2,372)	2.01 (6.6)	8 (17.6)
Nouvelle Invention	24-pounder	1,467 (3,234)	2.15 (7.1)	12 (26.5)
Vallière	4-pounder	563 (1,241)	2.00 (6.6)	2 (4.4)
Vallière	8-pounder	1,028 (2,266)	2.85 (9.4)	4 (8.8)
Vallière	12-pounder	1,566 (3,452)	3.17 (10.4)	6 (13.2)
Vallière	16-pounder	2,056 (4,533)	3.36 (11.0)	8 (17.6)
Vallière	24-pounder	2,643 (5,827)	3.53 (11.6)	12 (26.5)
