= Canon de 12 de Vallière =

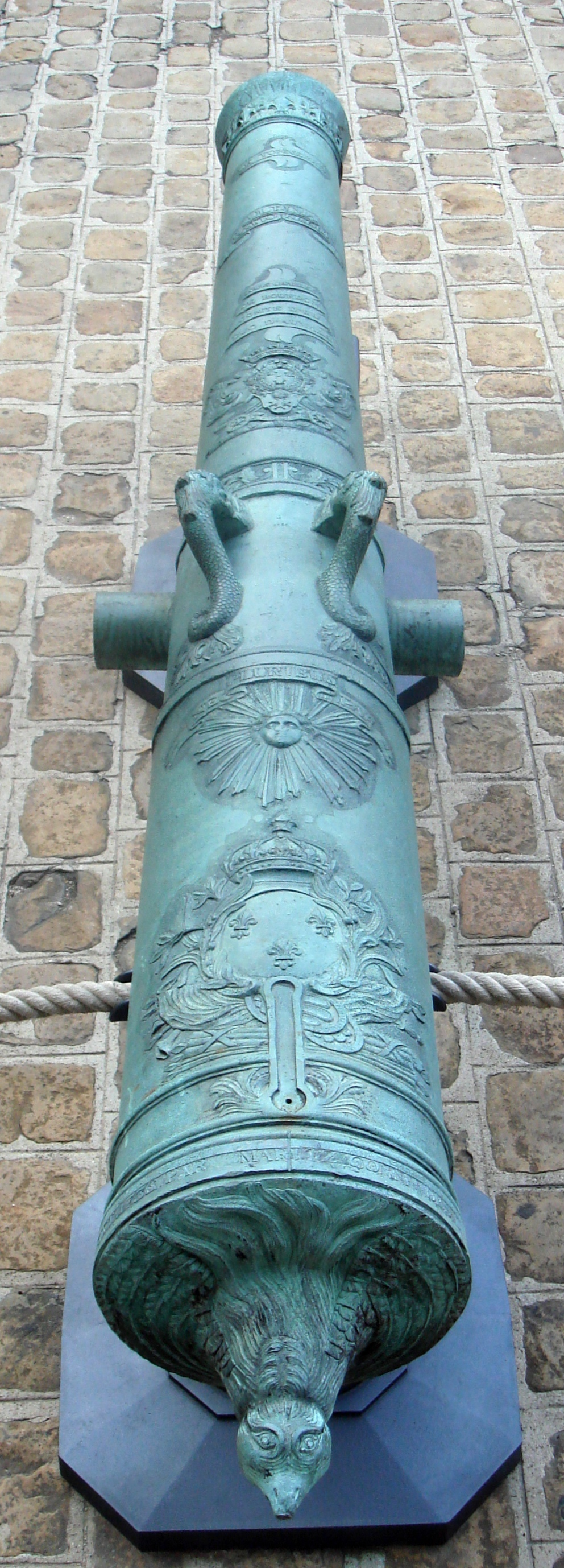
- Canon de 12 de Vallière (Le Tonnerre), 1736, Les Invalides
- Place of origin: France

Service history
- Used by: Kingdom of France; Sultanate of Mysore

Production history
- Designer: Florent-Jean de Vallière
- Designed: 1732
- Manufacturer: Jean Maritz, Commissaire des Fontes
- Produced: 1736

Specifications
- Mass: 1,510 kg (3,330 lb)
- Barrel length: 290 cm (110 in)
- Shell: 6 kg (13 lb) ball (12 French pounds)
- Caliber: 121 mm (4.8 in)
- Rate of fire: 1 or 2 shots per minute

The Canon de 12 de Vallière was a type of cannon designed by French officer Florent-Jean de Vallière (1667–1759), Director-General of the Battalions and Schools of the Artillery.

== Development ==
The cannon was a result of the Royal Ordonnance of October 7, 1732, enacted to reorganize and standardize the King's artillery.

Whereas numerous formats and designs had been in place in the French army, de Vallière standardized the French sizes in artillery pieces, by only allowing the production of 24, 12, 8 and 4 pound guns, mortars of 12 and 8 French inches, and stone-throwing mortars of 15 French inches. The 24-pdr was the largest caliber available to French artillery in this system.

The cannon used core drilling of the bore of cannons founded in one piece of bronze, a method developed by Jean Maritz, which allowed for much higher precision of the bore shape and surface, and therefore higher shooting efficiency.

As with other de Vallière guns, the 12-pdr was also highly decorated and contained numerous designs and inscriptions.

=== Front part ===
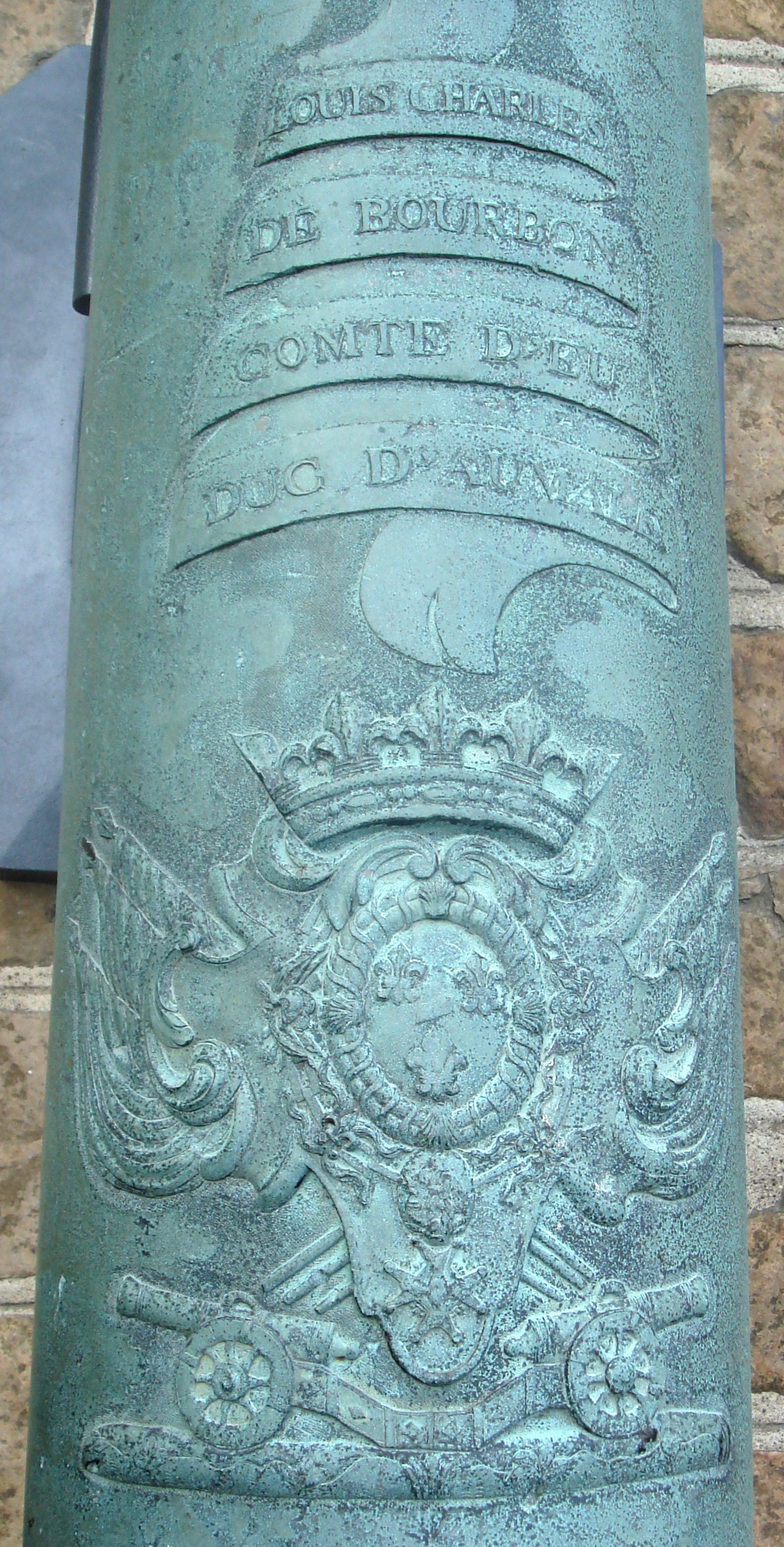
Emblem of "Louis Charles de Bourbon, Comte d'Eu, Duc d'Aumale" on Le Tonnerre, 1736.

Starting with the front part, the gun had a sight design at it extremity. Then followed the name of the gun (here Le Tonnerre). Then, a Latin phrase "Ultima Ratio Regum", initially introduced by Louis XIV, and a rather thorough description of the role of the gun: "The Last Argument of Kings". Under that appears the name "Louis Charles de Bourbon, comte d'Eu, duc d'Aumale", the Grand Maître de l'artillerie de France (Grand Master of the Artillery of France), followed by a royal emblem. In the middle of the cannon are trunnions, used to position the gun in place and elevate or depress it. On top of the trunnions are dolphin-shaped ornaments, which are used in lifting the gun.

=== Back part ===
The back part consists of, sometimes, an inscription showing the weight of the cannonball (for example a "12" for a 12-pounder), followed by a Latin inscription "Nec pluribus impar", meaning that the King is "Not unequal to many (suns)". This is followed by the royal crest of the Bourbon dynasty. At the bottom of the gun, the location and date of manufacture are inscribed, and finally the name and title of the founder (in the example "Fondu par J. Martiz, Commissaire des Fontes"). The breech is decorated with an animal face showing the rating of the gun ("Bird" or "Rooster" for a 12-pounder).

== Gallery ==
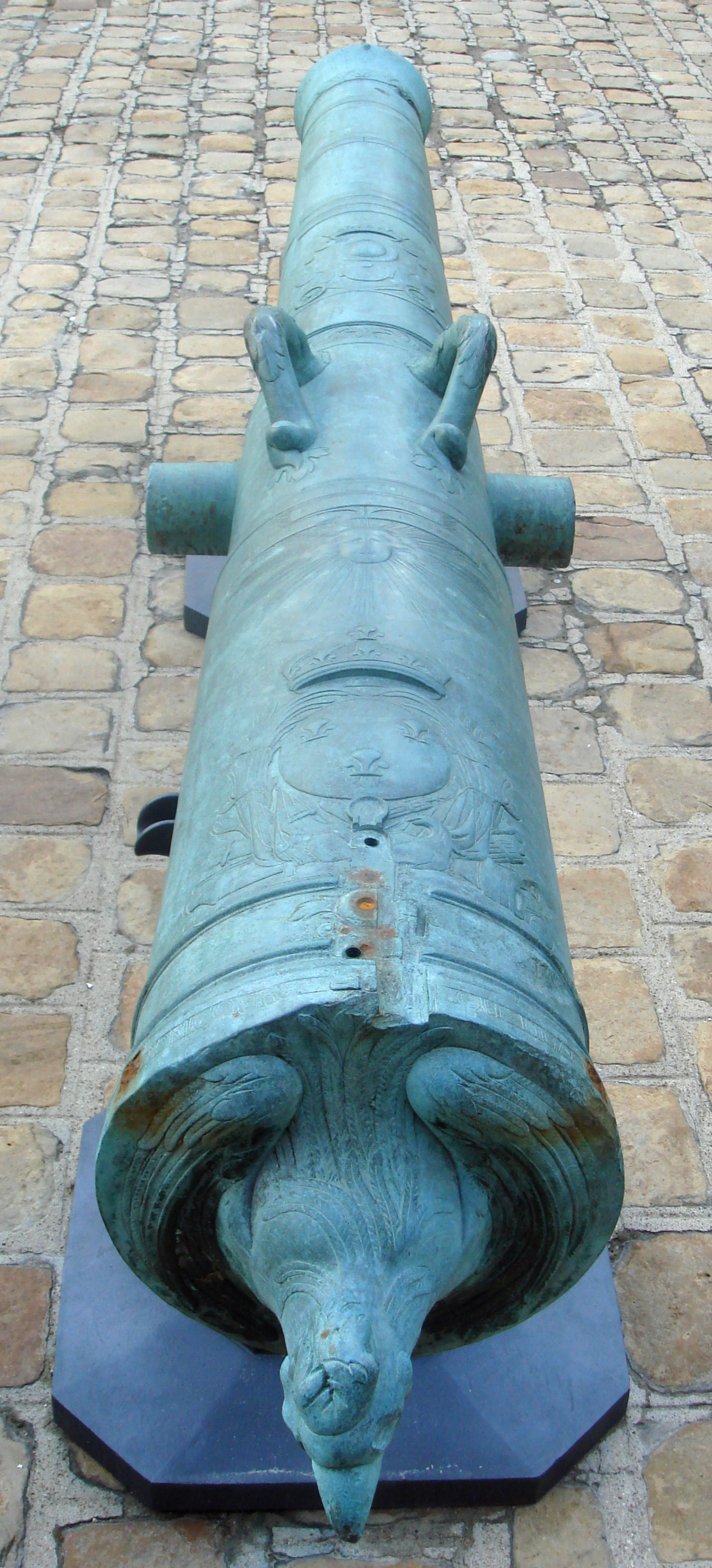
A Canon de 12 de Vallière, founded by Jean Maritz in 1736, with rooster head at the cascabel. Caliber: 121 mm. Length: 290 cm.

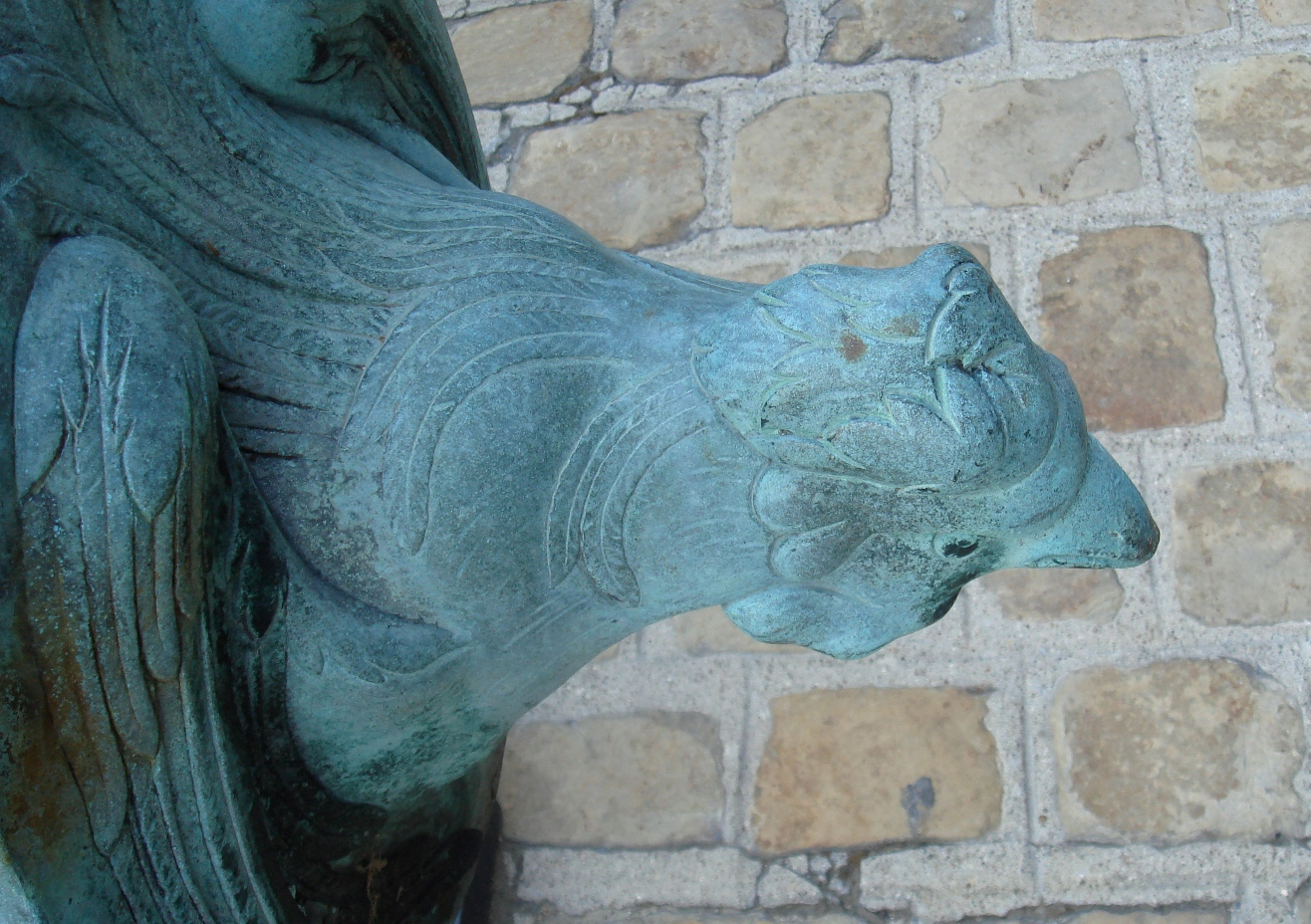
Detail of the rooster head.

== See also ==
Media related to Canon de 12 de Vallière at Wikimedia Commons
