= Mortier de 8 de Vallière =

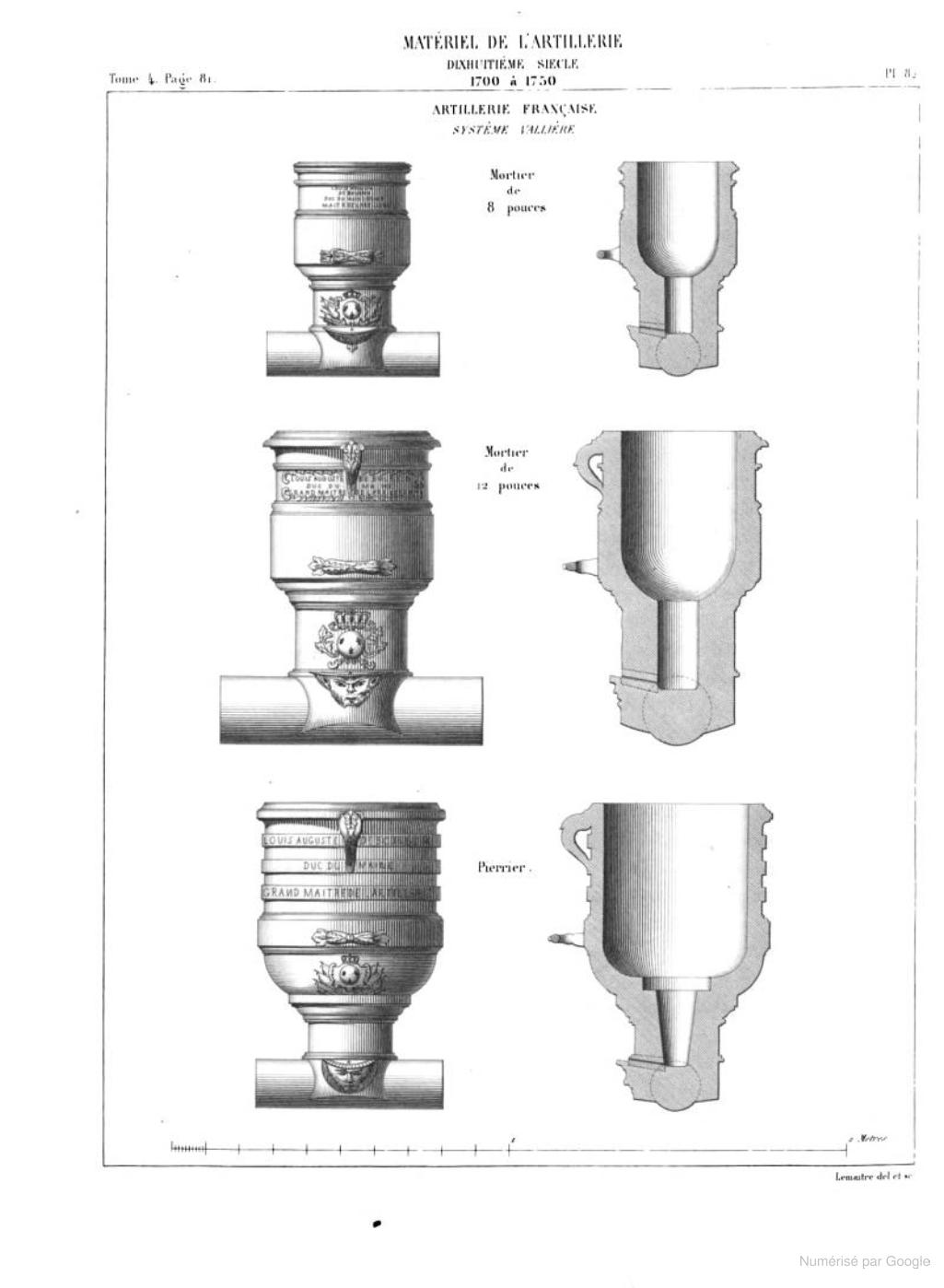
- 8-inch, 12-inch, and 15-inch mortars (top to bottom)
- Type: Artillery
- Place of origin: Kingdom of France

Service history
- In service: 1732–1756, 1772–1774
- Used by: Kingdom of France; United States
- Wars: War of the Polish Succession; War of the Austrian Succession; Seven Years' War

Production history
- Designer: Jean-Florent de Vallière
- Designed: 1732

Specifications
- Caliber: 216.56 mm (8.53 in)

The Mortier de 8 de Vallière was a type of French mortar designed by the Jean-Florent de Vallière (1667–1759), Director-General of the Battalions and Schools of the Artillery. The 8-pouce mortar ("pouce" is a French inch) belonged to the Vallière system which was established in 1732 with the intention to reduce the variety of cannons to five calibers and the number of mortars to three calibers, to standardize their production, and to manufacture all new artillery pieces in France.
