= Nec pluribus impar =

Latin phrase

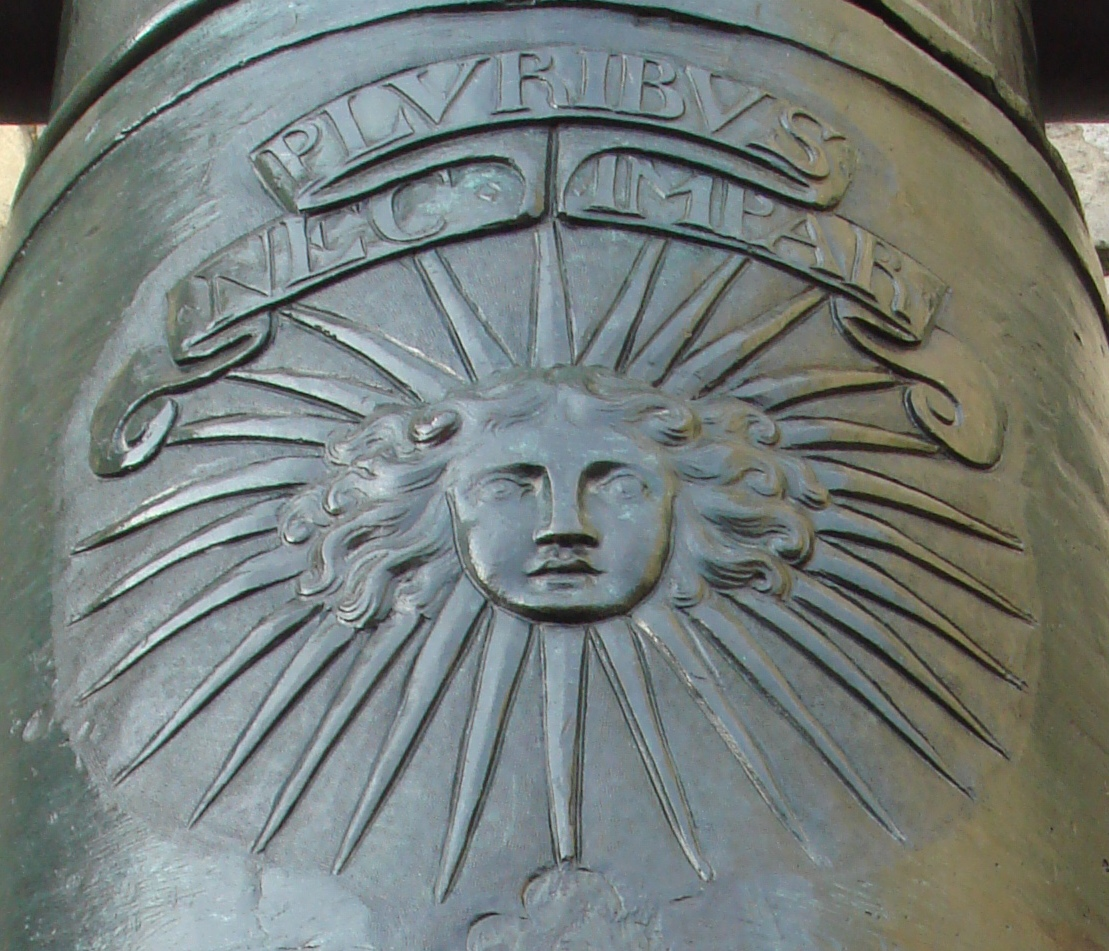
The Nec pluribus impar motto and the sun-king emblem, on a de Vallière gun, 1745.

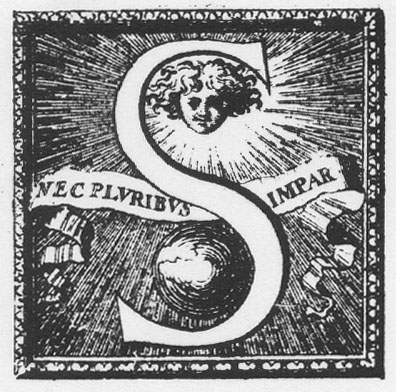
The "S" letter (for Sun) with the motto Nec pluribus impar. Dictionnaire de l'Académie Française, 1694.

Nec pluribus impar (literally: "Not unequal to many") is a Latin motto adopted by Louis XIV of France from 1658. It was often inscribed together with the symbol of the "Sun King": a head within rays of sunlight. Apparently a play on the ancient motto nec plus ultra ("beyond which (there is) nothing more") (pluribus being the dative and ablative plural forms of plus and impar rhyming with ultra), its meaning has always been obscure.

== Meaning ==
While the motto relates to the allegory of the "Sun King", its precise meaning is obscure. Philip F. Riley calls it "almost untranslatable". Historian Henri Martin called it "very pompous and, above all, obscure and perplexing". Louvois, Louis' War Secretary, interpreted it as seul contre tous — "alone against all"; lexicographer Pierre Larousse suggested au-dessus de tous (comme le soleil) — "above all (like the sun)". John Martin says "[Louis'] matchless splendour was expressed by the motto Nec Pluribus Impar - not unequal to many suns.". Yves-Marie Bercé gives Suffisant (seul) a tant de choses ("Sufficient (alone) for so many things") or Tout lui est possible ("Everything is possible for him"), i.e., "not unequal to many [tasks]". Louis himself wrote:

Those who saw me managing the cares of royalty with such ease and with such confidence induced me to add [to the image of the sun] the sphere of the earth, and as its motto NEC PLURIBUS IMPAR, by which they meant to flatter the ambitions of a young king, in that with all my capacities, I would be just as capable of ruling still other empires as would the sun of illuminating still other worlds with its rays. I know that some obscurity has been found in these words, and I have no doubt that the same symbol might have suggested some happier ones. Others have been presented to me since, but this one having already been used in my buildings and in an infinite number of other things, I have not deemed appropriate to change it.

— Louis XIV, 1662.

== Origin and use ==
The first use of the motto and the symbol is usually given as the great Carrousel of 1662 in what is now the Place du Carrousel, to celebrate the birth of his son Louis, the Dauphin. However, the motto appeared as early as 1658 on a medal. Voltaire attributes the motto and emblem to Louis Douvrier, who derived them from a device of Philip II of Spain, of whom it was said the sun never set on his dominions. Polemicists in the Spanish Netherlands pointed out the unoriginal nature of the symbol. Louis XIV himself disliked it, but it proved popular with the public and so he tolerated it.

The motto and sun-king device appeared on many buildings, as well as on cannons. The classical de Vallière guns in particular bear the motto and the symbol, even for those founded long after Louis XIV's death.

Many of Louis' subordinates adopted emblems and mottos playing off those of the sovereign. César de Beaufort, Admiral of France, adopted a moon with motto Elle obéit au soleil et commande aux flots ("It obeys the sun and commands the waves"); Duc de Sully adopted a burning-mirror with motto Je brûle sous son regard ("I burn [under its gaze / at his command])".

It is the motto of Ribét Academy, a private preparatory school in Los Angeles; the 1st Foreign Cavalry Regiment of the 6th light armored brigade of the French Army; and Muir College a public, English medium school for boys located in Uitenhage, South Africa.

It is also found on the coat of arms of Zvishavane, Zimbabwe.

== See also ==
- Honneur et Fidélité
