= Canon de 4 de Vallière =

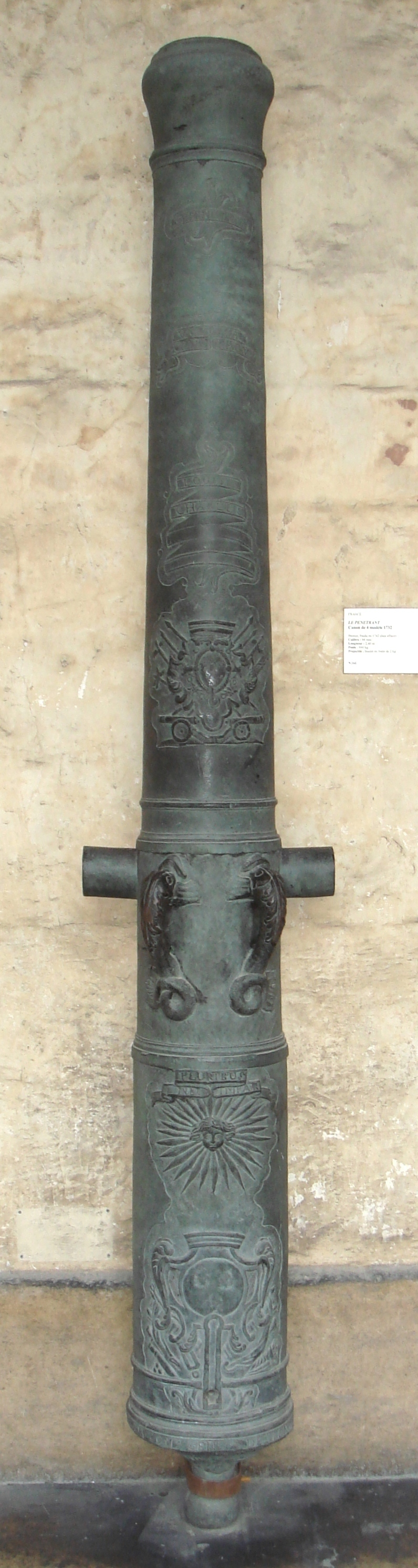
- Canon de 4 de Vallière (Le Pénétrant), Les Invalides
- Place of origin: France

Service history
- Used by: France

Production history
- Designer: Jean-Florent de Vallière
- Designed: 1732
- Manufacturer: J. Gor, Commissaire des Fontes

Specifications
- Mass: 650 kg
- Barrel length: 240 cm
- Shell: 2 kg ball (4 French pounds)
- Caliber: 84 mm (3.31 in)
- Rate of fire: 1 or 2 shots per minute

The Canon de 4 de Vallière was a type of cannon designed by the French officer Jean-Florent de Vallière (1667–1759), Director-General of the Battalions and Schools of the Artillery.

The cannon was a result of the Royal Ordonnance of October 7, 1732, enacted to reorganize and standardize the King's artillery.

Whereas numerous formats and designs had been in place in the French army, De Vallière standardized the French sizes in artillery pieces. The Vallière system allowed only for the production of 24, 12, 8 and 4 pound (livre) guns, mortars of 8-pouce and 12-pouce, and stone-throwing mortars of 15-pouce (A French inch is a pouce.). The 24-pounder was the largest caliber available to French artillery in this system.

The cannon used core drilling of the bore of cannons founded in one piece of bronze, a method developed at that time by Jean Maritz, which allowed for much higher precision of the bore shape and surface, and therefore higher shooting efficiency.

As with other de Valliere guns, the 4-pdr was also highly decorated and contained numerous designs and inscriptions.

== Front part ==
Starting with the front part, the gun had a sight design at it extremity. The followed the name of the gun (here Le Pénétrant). Then, a Latin phrase "Ultima Ratio Regum", initially introduced by Louis XIV, and rather descriptive of the role of the gun: "The Last Argument of the King". Under that appears the name "Louis Charles de Bourbon, comte d'Eu, duc d'Aumale", the Grand Maître de l'artillerie de France (Grand Master of the Artillery of France), followed by a royal emblem. In the middle of the cannon are trunnions, used to position the gun in place and elevate or depress it. On top of the trunnions are dolphin-shaped ornaments, which are used in lifting the gun.

== Back part ==
The back part consists in, sometimes, an inscription showing the weight of the cannonball (for example a "4" for a 4-pounder), followed by a Latin inscription "Nec pluribus impar", meaning that the King is "Not unequal to many (suns)". This is followed by the royal crest of the Bourbon dynasty. At the bottom of the gun, the location and date of manufacture are inscribed, and finally the name and title of the founder (in the example "Fondu par J. Gor, Commissaire des Fontes"). The breech is decorated with an animal face showing the rating of the gun ("Face in a sunburst" for a 4-pounder).

== Operational activity ==
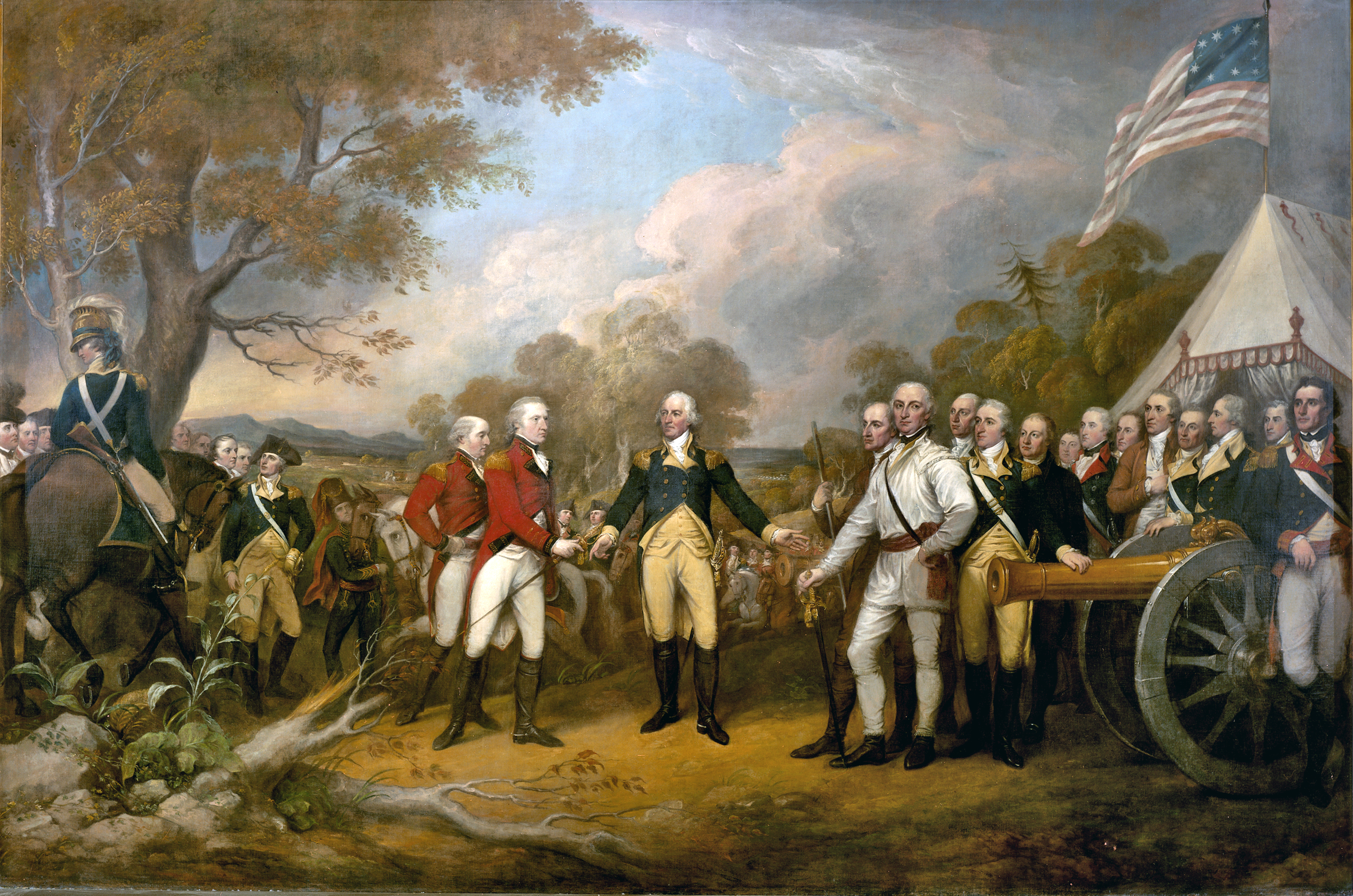
"The surrender at Saratoga" shows General Daniel Morgan in front of a de Vallière 4-pounder.

Numerous de Valliere guns were used in the American War of Independence, especially the smaller 4-pdr field guns. The guns were shipped from France, and the field carriages provided for in the US. These guns played an important role in such battles as the Battle of Saratoga, or the Siege of Yorktown.

== Gallery ==
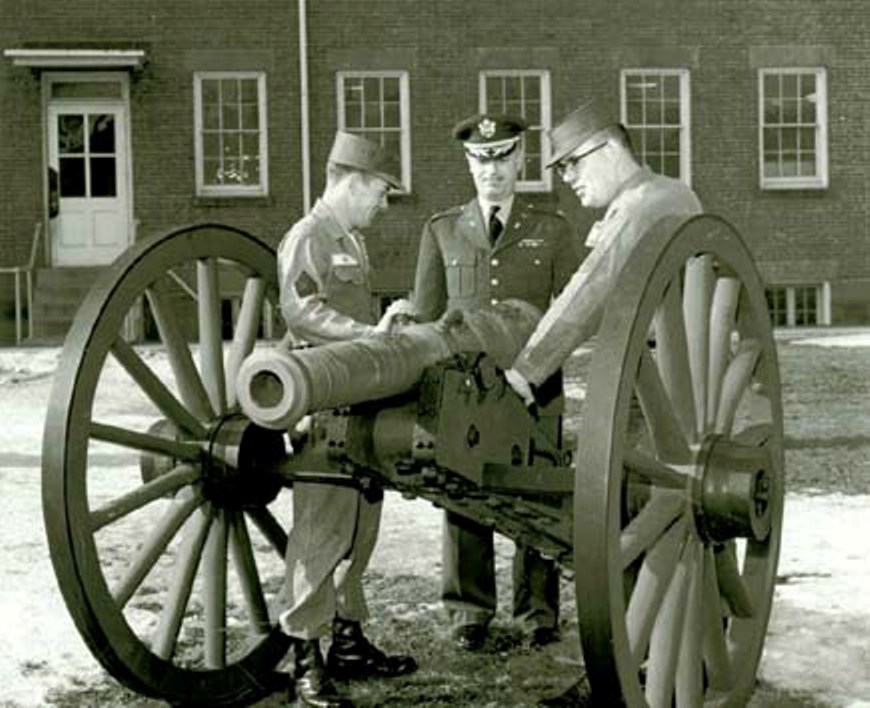
US Army personnel with a de Vallière 4-pounder in the 60s

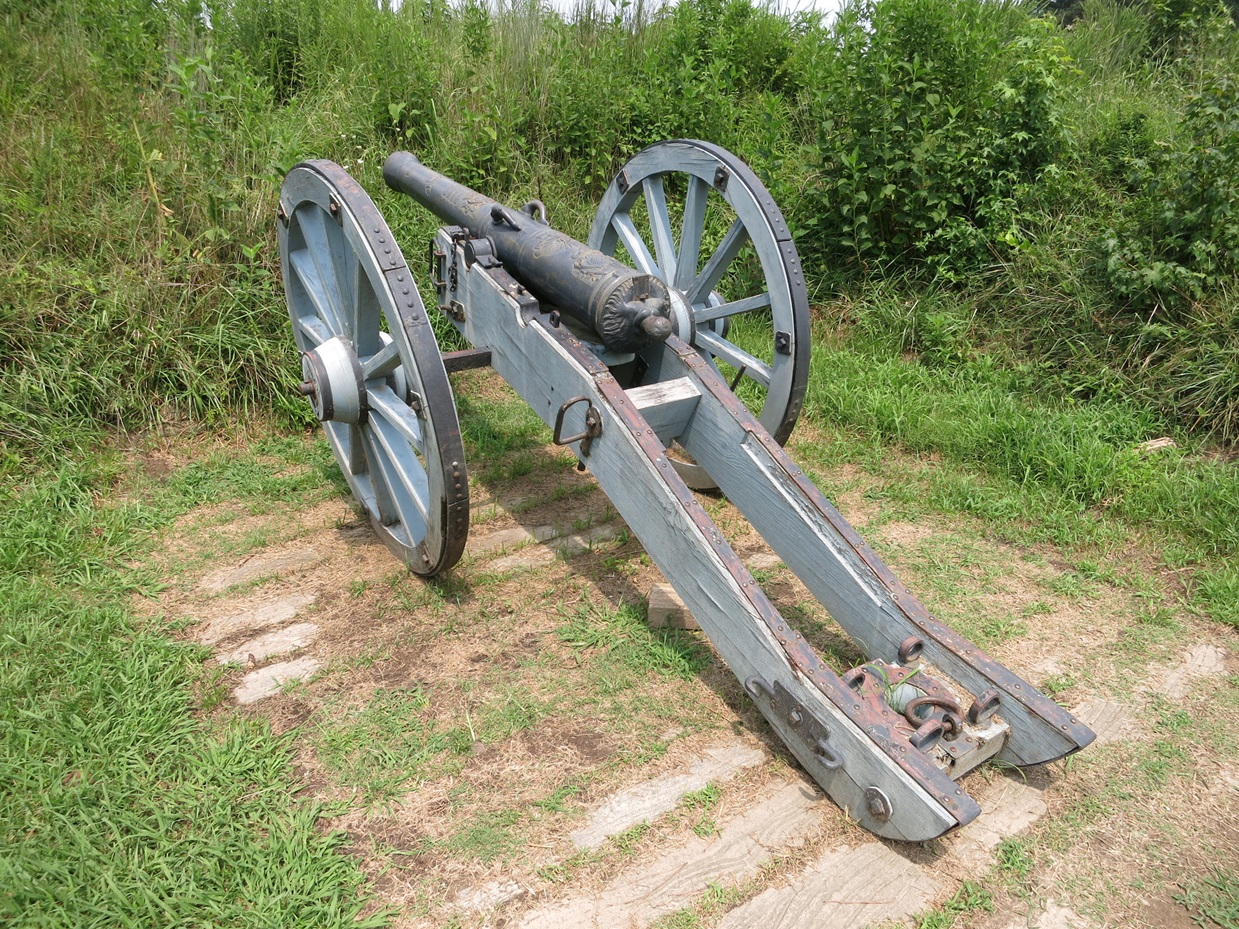
Vallière 4-pounder La Souris, French Grand Battery, Yorktown VA

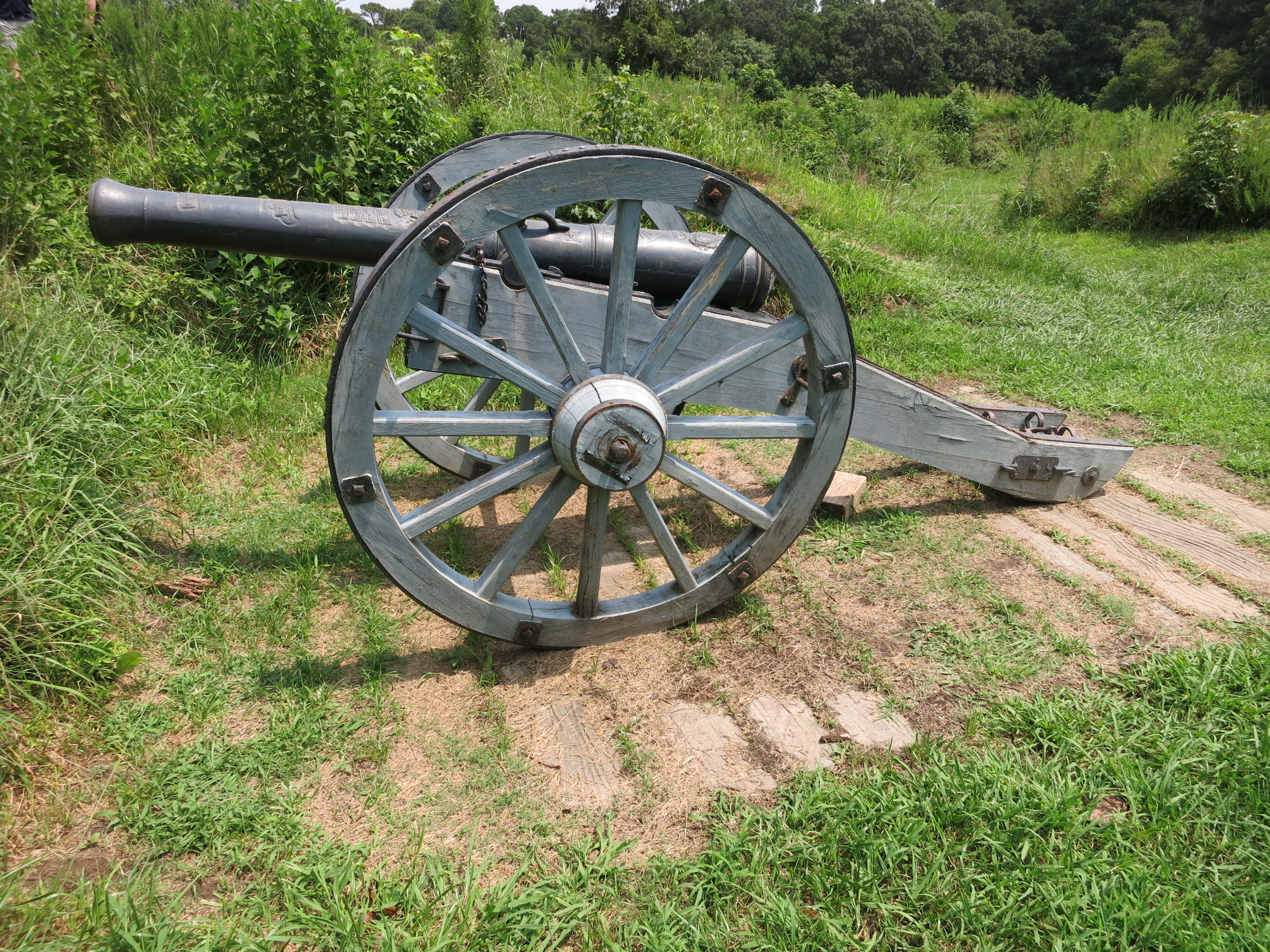
Vallière 4-pounder La Souris, French Grand Battery, Yorktown VA

== See also ==
Media related to Canon de 4 de Vallière at Wikimedia Commons
