= Canon de 24 de Vallière =

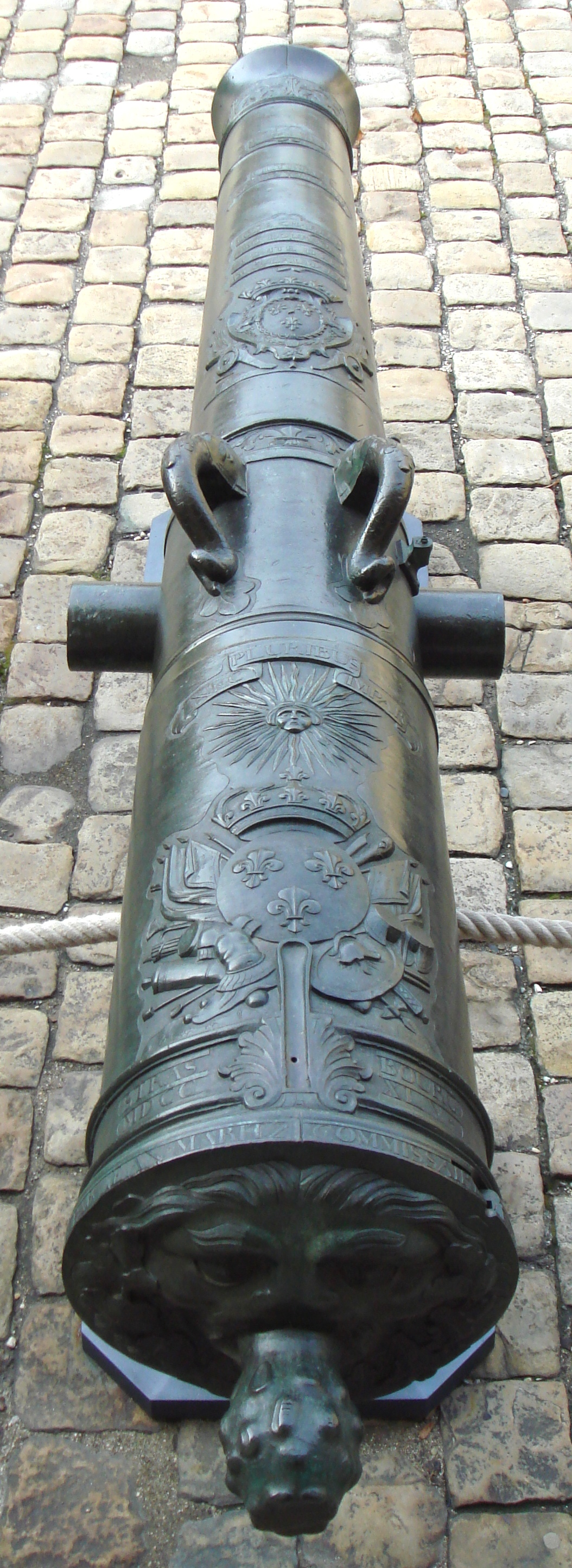
- Canon de 24 de Vallière (Uranie), founded by Jean Maritz in 1745, Les Invalides
- Place of origin: France

Service history
- Used by: France

Production history
- Designer: Florent-Jean de Vallière
- Designed: 1732
- Manufacturer: Jean Maritz

Specifications
- Mass: 5,400 pounds (2,400 kg)
- Barrel length: 310 cm (10 ft 2 in)
- Shell: 12 kg (26 lb) ball (24 French pounds)
- Caliber: 155 mm (6.1 in)
- Rate of fire: 1 or 2 shots per minute
- Effective firing range: 600 m (2,000 ft)

The Canon de 24 de Vallière was a type of cannon designed by the French officer Florent-Jean de Vallière (1667–1759), Director-General of the Battalions and Schools of the Artillery.

The cannon was a result of the Royal Ordonnance of October 7, 1732, enacted to reorganize and improve the King's artillery.

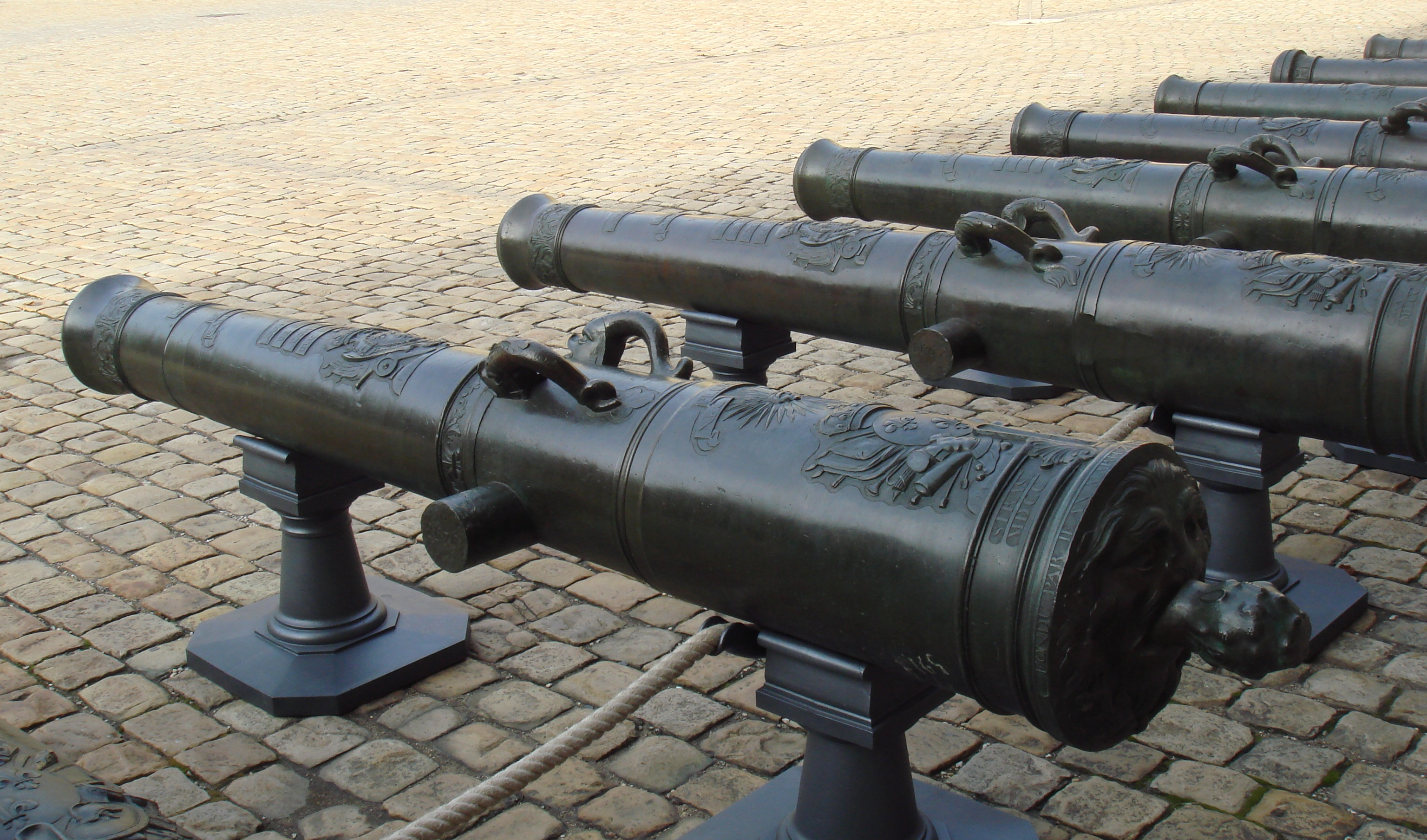
De Vallière 24-pdr guns, Les Invalides.

Whereas numerous formats and designs had been in place in the French army, De Vallière standardized the French sizes in artillery pieces by allowing only for the production of 24, 12, 8, and 4 pound guns, mortars of 13 in (33 cm) and 9 in (23 cm), and stone-throwing mortars of 16 in (41 cm). The 24-pdr was the largest caliber available to French artillery in this system.

The cannon used core drilling of the bore of cannons founded in one piece of bronze, a method developed at that time by Jean Maritz, which allowed for much higher precision of the bore shape and surface, and therefore higher shooting efficiency.

As with other de Valliere guns, the 24-pdr was also highly decorated and contained numerous designs and inscriptions.

== Front part ==
Starting with the front part, the gun had a sight design at its extremity. They followed the name of the gun (here Uranie). Then, a Latin phrase "Ultima Ratio Regum", initially introduced by Louis XIV, and rather descriptive of the role of the gun: "The Last Argument of Kings". Under that appears the name "Louis Charles de Bourbon, Comte d'Eu, Duc d'Aumale", the Grand Maître de l'artillerie de France (Grand Master of the Artillery of France), followed by a royal emblem. In the middle of the cannon are trunnions, used to position the gun in place and elevate or depress it. On top of the trunnions are dolphin-shaped ornaments, which are used in lifting the gun.

== Back part ==
The back part consists in, sometimes, an inscription showing the weight of the cannonball (for example a "4" for a 4-pounder), followed by a Latin inscription "Nec pluribus impar", meaning that the King is "Not unequal to many (suns)". This is followed by the royal crest of the Bourbon dynasty. At the bottom of the gun, the location and date of manufacture are inscribed (in the example "Strasbourg, 1745"), and finally the name and title of the founder (in the example "Fondu par Jean Maritz, Commissaire des Fontes de France"). The cascabel is decorated with an animal face showing the rating of the gun (the lion head for a 24-pounder).

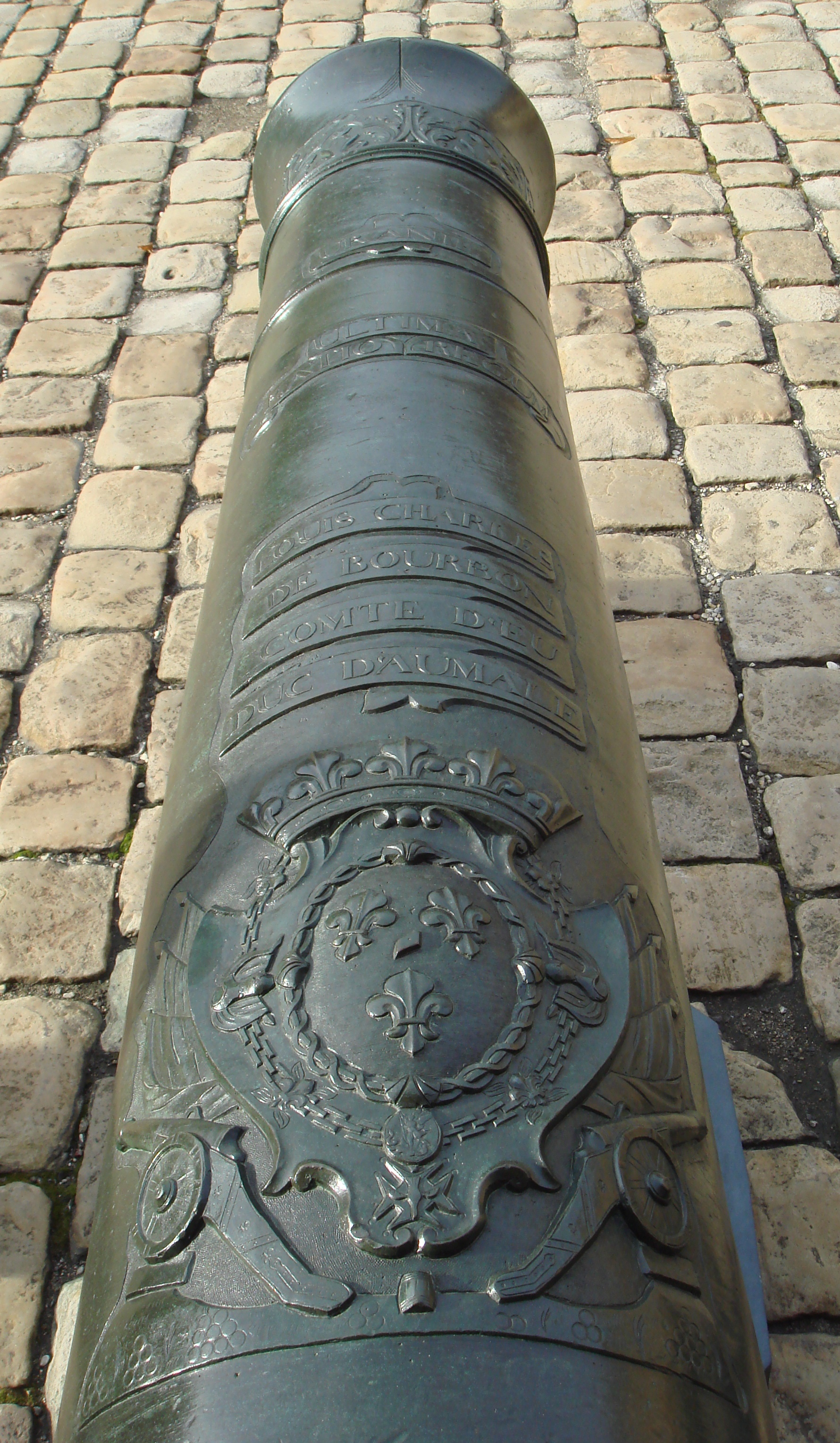
Front part of the de Valliere 24-pdr gun Uranie.

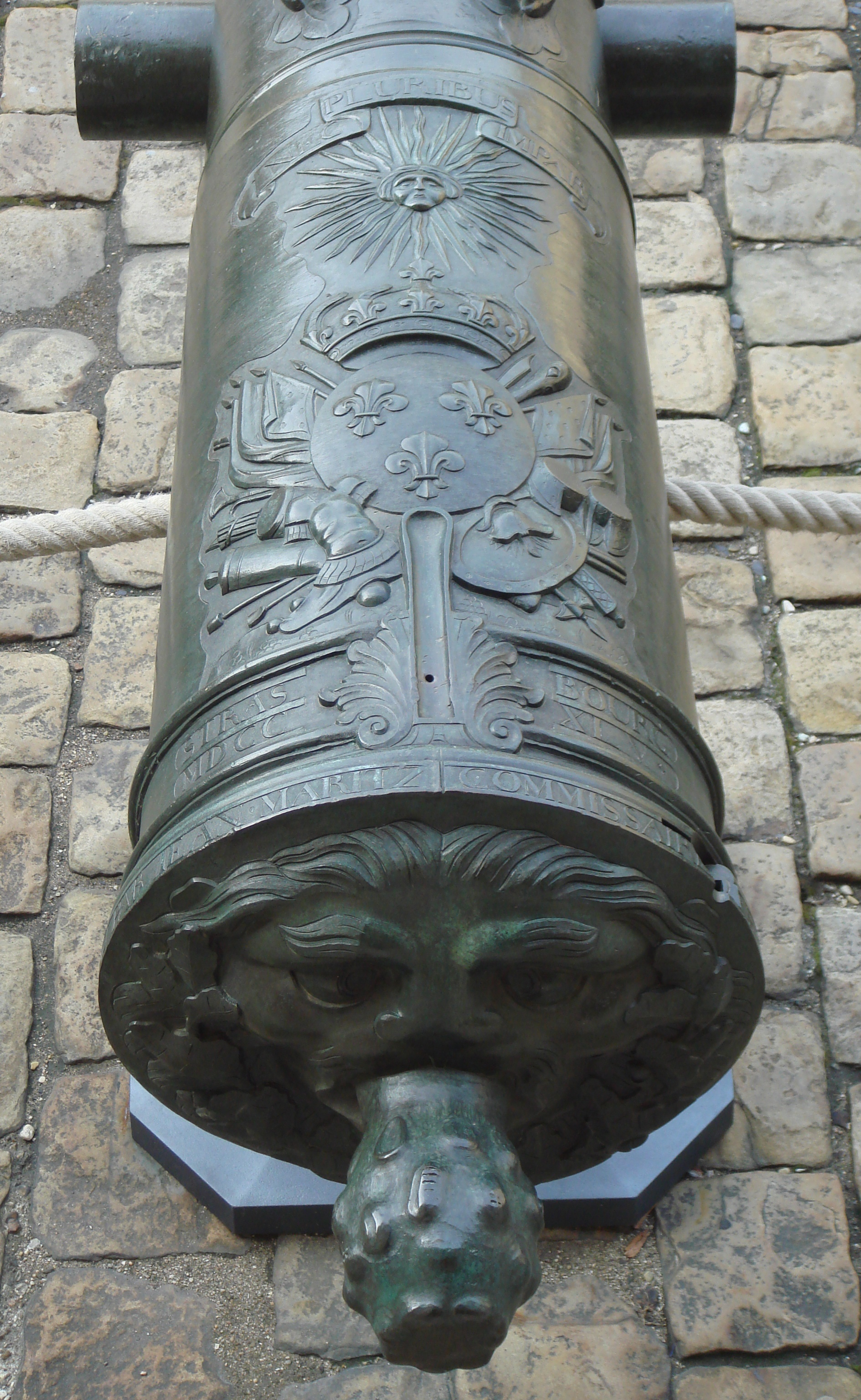
Back part of the de Valliere 24-pdr gun Uranie.
