= Canon de 16 de Vallière =

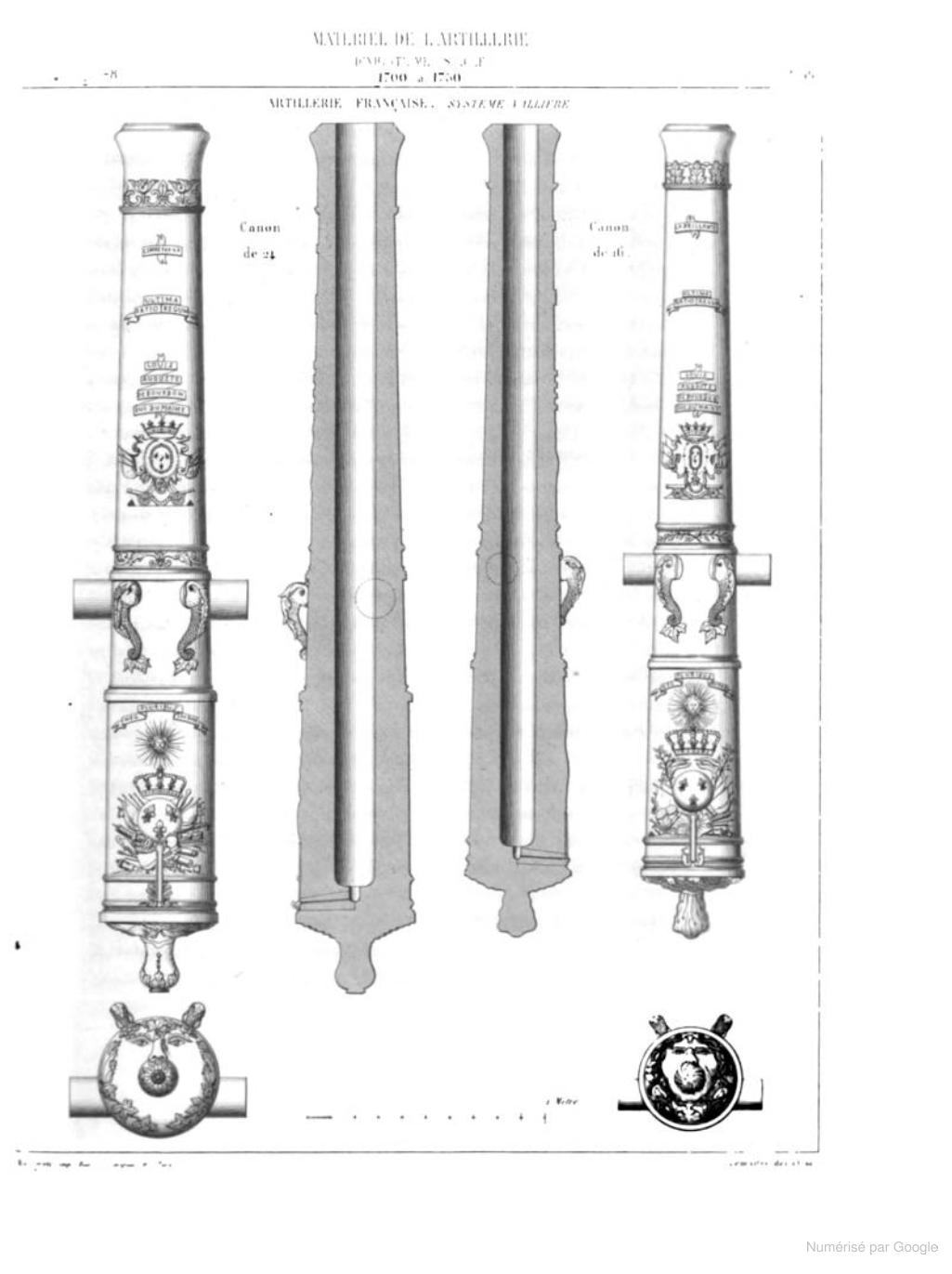
- Canon de 24 and Canon de 16 de Vallière (l to r)
- Type: Artillery
- Place of origin: Kingdom of France

Service history
- In service: 1732–1756, 1772–1774
- Used by: Kingdom of France; United States
- Wars: War of the Polish Succession; War of the Austrian Succession; Seven Years' War

Production history
- Designer: Jean-Florent de Vallière
- Designed: 1732

Specifications
- Mass: 2,054 kg (4,528 lb)
- Length: 3.10 m (10.2 ft)
- Shell: round shot 8 kg (17.6 lb)
- Caliber: 134.5 mm (5.30 in)
- Rate of fire: 1 shot per minute

The Canon de 16 de Vallière was a type of cannon designed by the French officer Jean-Florent de Vallière (1667–1759), Director-General of the Battalions and Schools of the Artillery. The 16-pounder gun was part of the Vallière system which was established in 1732 with the intention to reduce the variety of cannons to five calibers and the number of mortars to three calibers, to standardize their production, and to manufacture all new artillery pieces in France.
