= Canon de 8 de Vallière =

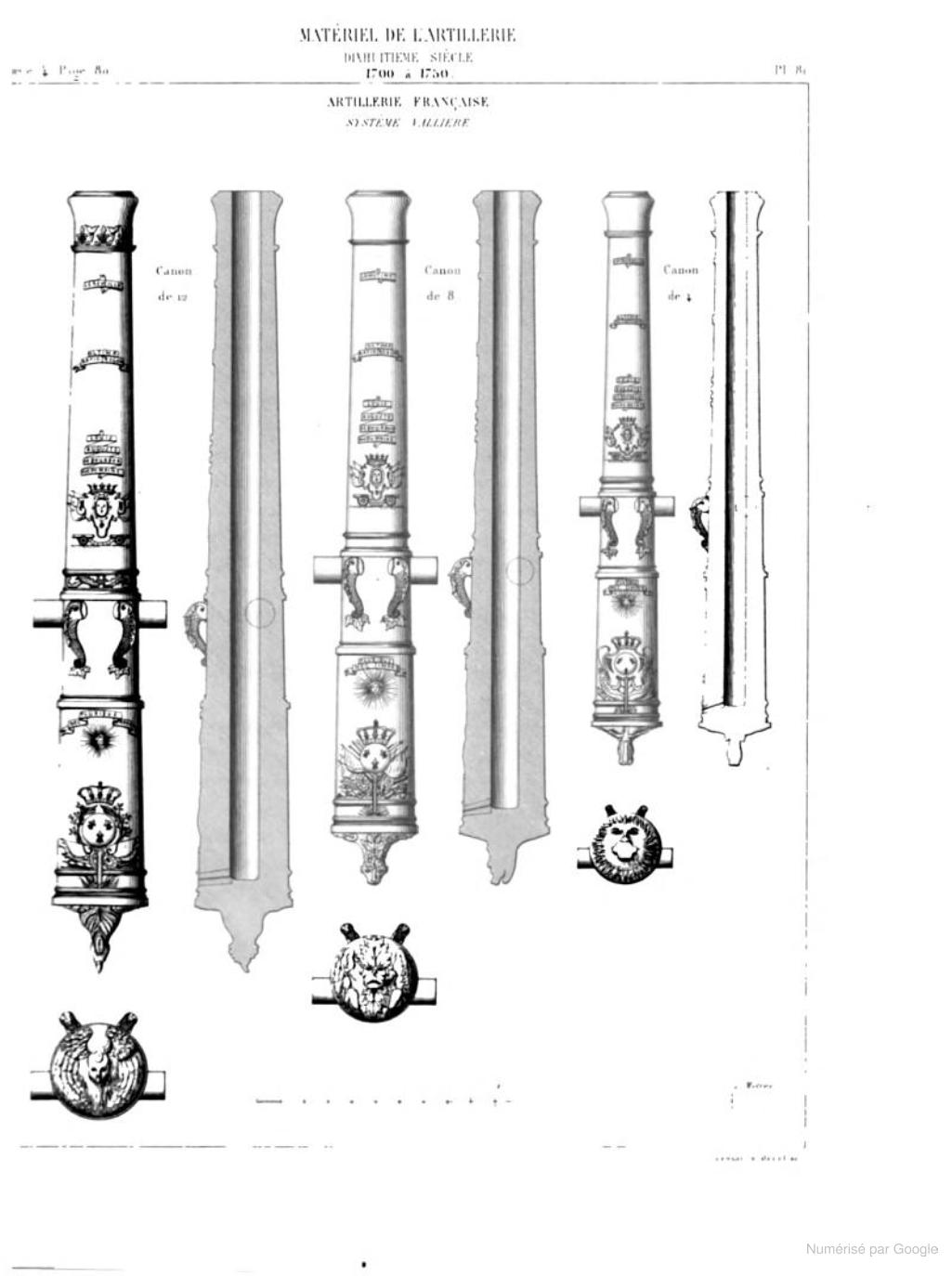
- Canon de 12, 8, and 4 de Vallière (l to r)
- Type: Artillery
- Place of origin: Kingdom of France

Service history
- In service: 1732–1756, 1772–1774
- Used by: Kingdom of France; United States
- Wars: War of the Polish Succession; War of the Austrian Succession; Seven Years' War

Production history
- Designer: Jean-Florent de Vallière
- Designed: 1732

Specifications
- Mass: 1,028 kg (2,266 lb)
- Length: 2.64 m (8.7 ft)
- Shell: round shot 4 kg (8.8 lb)
- Caliber: 106.0 mm (4.17 in)
- Rate of fire: 1 shot per minute

The Canon de 8 de Vallière was a type of cannon designed by the French officer Jean-Florent de Vallière (1667–1759), Director-General of the Battalions and Schools of the Artillery. The 8-pounder gun was part of the Vallière system which was established in 1732 with the intention of reducing the variety of cannons to five calibers and the types of mortars to three calibers, of standardizing their production, and of manufacturing all new artillery pieces in France.
