= Jean-Florent de Vallière =

French artillery officer

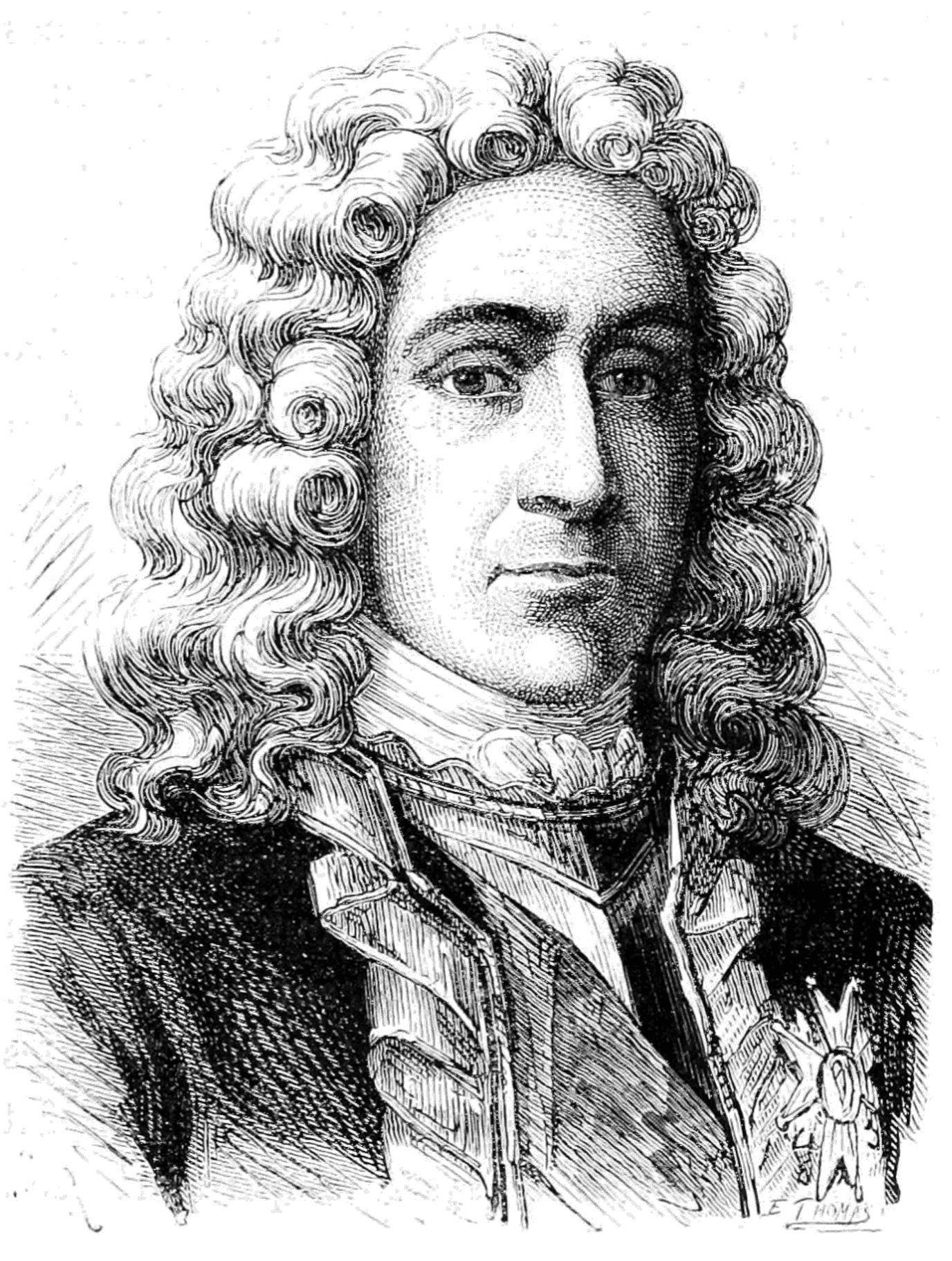
- Jean-Florent de Vallière
- Born: 7 September 1667; Paris
- Died: 6 January 1759 (aged 91); Paris
- Military career
- Allegiance: Kingdom of France
- Branch: French Army
- Service years: 1685–1759
- Rank: Lieutenant general
- Conflicts: Nine Years' War; War of the Spanish Succession; War of the Polish Succession; War of the Austrian Succession
- Awards: Order of Saint Louis, GC, 1739
- Other work: French Academy of Sciences, 1731; Académie de Marine, 1752

Jean-Florent de Vallière (7 September 1667 – 6 January 1759) was a French artillery officer during the reigns of King Louis XIV and King Louis XV. In 1685, he joined the French Royal Army as a sous-lieutenant of sappers. During the Nine Years' War he served at the sieges of Philippsburg, Mons and Namur, and at the battles of Fleurus and Leuze. He also took part in lesser sieges and battles, including an action where he was wounded while leading an assault. After the war he was promoted to captain.

During the War of the Spanish Succession he fought at two sieges of Landau and was badly wounded in the Siege of Nice. He fought at every major battle in Flanders and Germany. He took part in sieges at Aire-sur-la-Lys where he was wounded, Douai, and Turin. In the Siege of Le Quesnoy in 1712, he was the besieging army's chief artillery officer. He was promoted to general officer at the end of the war. He was promoted again in 1719 and named Director General of Artillery in 1726.

During the War of the Polish Succession he commanded the artillery of the army operating on the Rhine River, during which he was promoted lieutenant general. In the War of the Austrian Succession, Vallière fought at the Battle of Dettingen and the Siege of Fribourg. In the latter action, his leg was injured while serving in the flooded trenches. Vallière became a member of the French Academy of Sciences and a member of the Académie de Marine.

Vallière was largely responsible for implementing the Vallière system, a major reform of the French artillery beginning in 1732. He standardized the French artillery by reducing the number of different cannons to only five calibers. This briefly put France's artillery ahead of all other European powers. Though the cannons were well-made and accurate, they were very heavy and did not perform well in the field during the European wars in the 1740s and 1750s. This led to the Vallière system's replacement by the Gribeauval system.

== Family ==
Jean-Florent de Vallière was born in Paris on 7 September 1667 of parents Jean de Vallière and Anne Huée d'Arteville. His father Jean served as an infantryman during the Siege of Candia, was wounded at the Siege of Maastricht in 1673, and ended his military career as a captain of cavalry. Jean-Florent's younger brother would die of wounds received at the Siege of Aire-sur-la-Lys in 1710.

Jean-Florent de Vallière's first marriage was to Mademoiselle Trudaine. His second marriage was to Lady Marguerite Martin, daughter of a brigadier in the Royal Army. His second wife bore him two sons. Joseph-Florent de Vallière, the elder became lieutenant general in 1748, Director General of Engineers and Artillery in 1757, governor of Bergues St. Vinox in 1759, and member of the French Academy of Sciences in 1761. The younger son became mestre de camp (colonel) of the Royal Corsica Regiment and later maréchal de camp (major general) in the Royal Army.

== Service in Louis XIV's wars ==
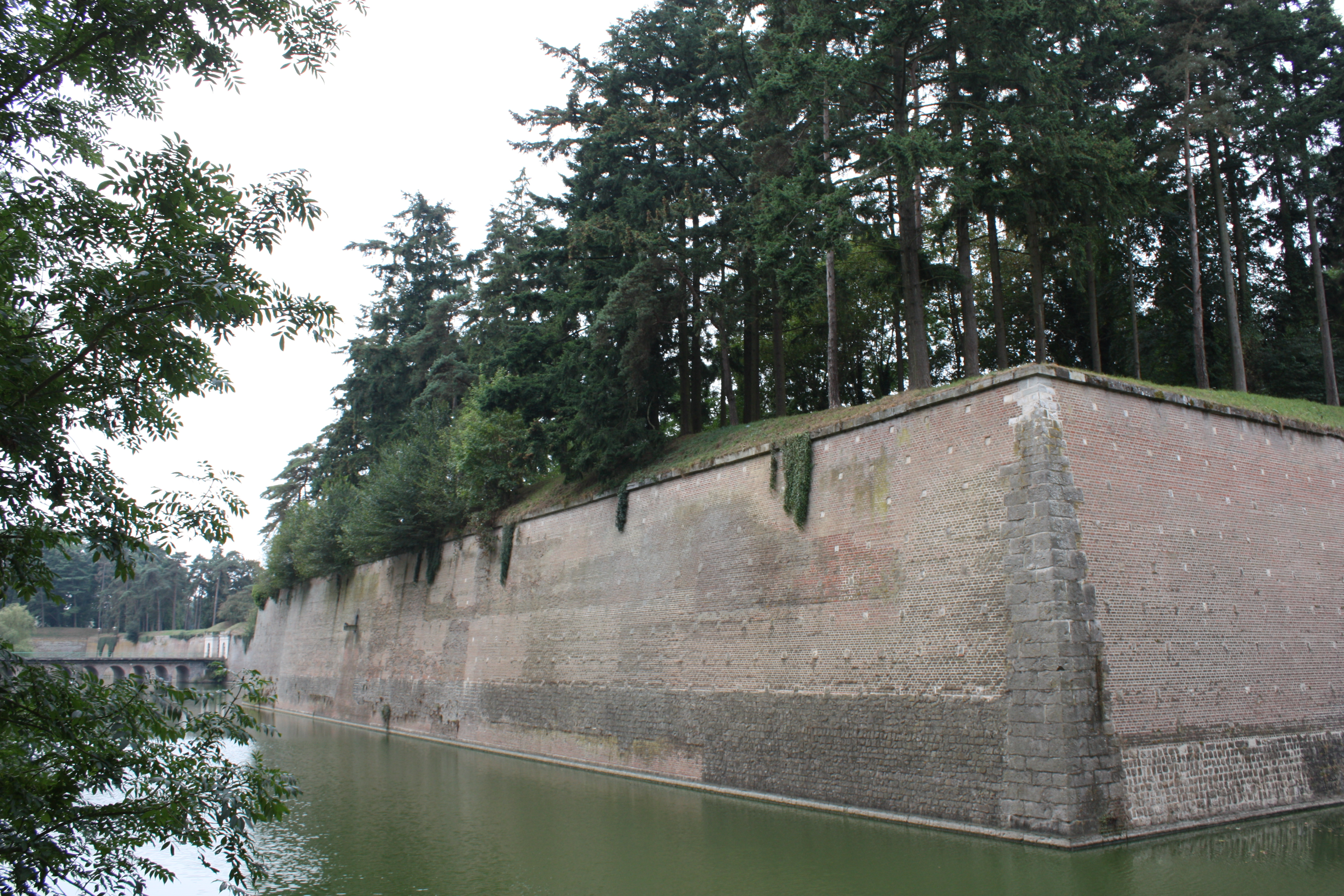
Le Quesnoy's 18th century defenses have been preserved.

Vallière entered service as a sous-lieutenant of mineurs in 1685 and quickly showed great aptitude in his work. In 1688 during the Nine Years' War, he served with valor at the sieges of Philippsburg, Mannheim and Frankenthal. He was wounded in the right arm by a saber cut while leading a successful assault at the storming of Roxheim. By 1690, he was a lieutenant of mineurs. Vallière served during the Siege of Mons in 1691, the Siege of Namur in 1692, the Bombardment of Brussels in 1695, and the Siege of Barcelona in 1697. He also fought at the Battle of Fleurus in 1690 and the Battle of Leuze in 1692. He was promoted captain of mineurs on 3 September 1699.

Vallière served under the Comte de Mélac at the Siege of Landau in 1702 and again in the Siege of Landau in 1704. He fought at the Battle of Friedlingen in 1702, the Battle of Blenheim (Höchstädt) in 1704, the Battle of Ramillies in 1706, the Battle of Oudenarde in 1708, the Battle of Malplaquet in 1709, and the Battle of Denain in 1712. (Note: The source incorrectly stated that Ramillies was fought in 1705.) He took part in the Siege of Trarbach in 1702, the Siege of Kehl in 1703, the Siege of Turin in 1706, and the Siege of Douai in 1710.

Vallière served in the Siege of Nice in 1705 where he was wounded by a round shot that exposed the bone in his right arm and took a long time to heal. He earned promotion to captain-general on 1 April 1705 and brigadier on 9 December 1710. At the Siege of Le Quesnoy in 1712, he was for the first time the commander of the besieging artillery. With 38 cannons he silenced the fortress artillery on the front of attack. He left to visit the Siege of Aire-sur-la-Lys where he was wounded by an exploding bomb. (Note: Vallière was badly wounded at the Siege of Nice, but the date was not given. Nice was besieged in 1691 and 1705. Since he fought in Flanders at Fleurus, Mons, Leuze, and Namur in 1690–1692, it was unlikely that he was at Nice in 1691. Therefore, it is assumed that he was at the Siege of Nice in 1705–1706.)

== Later career ==
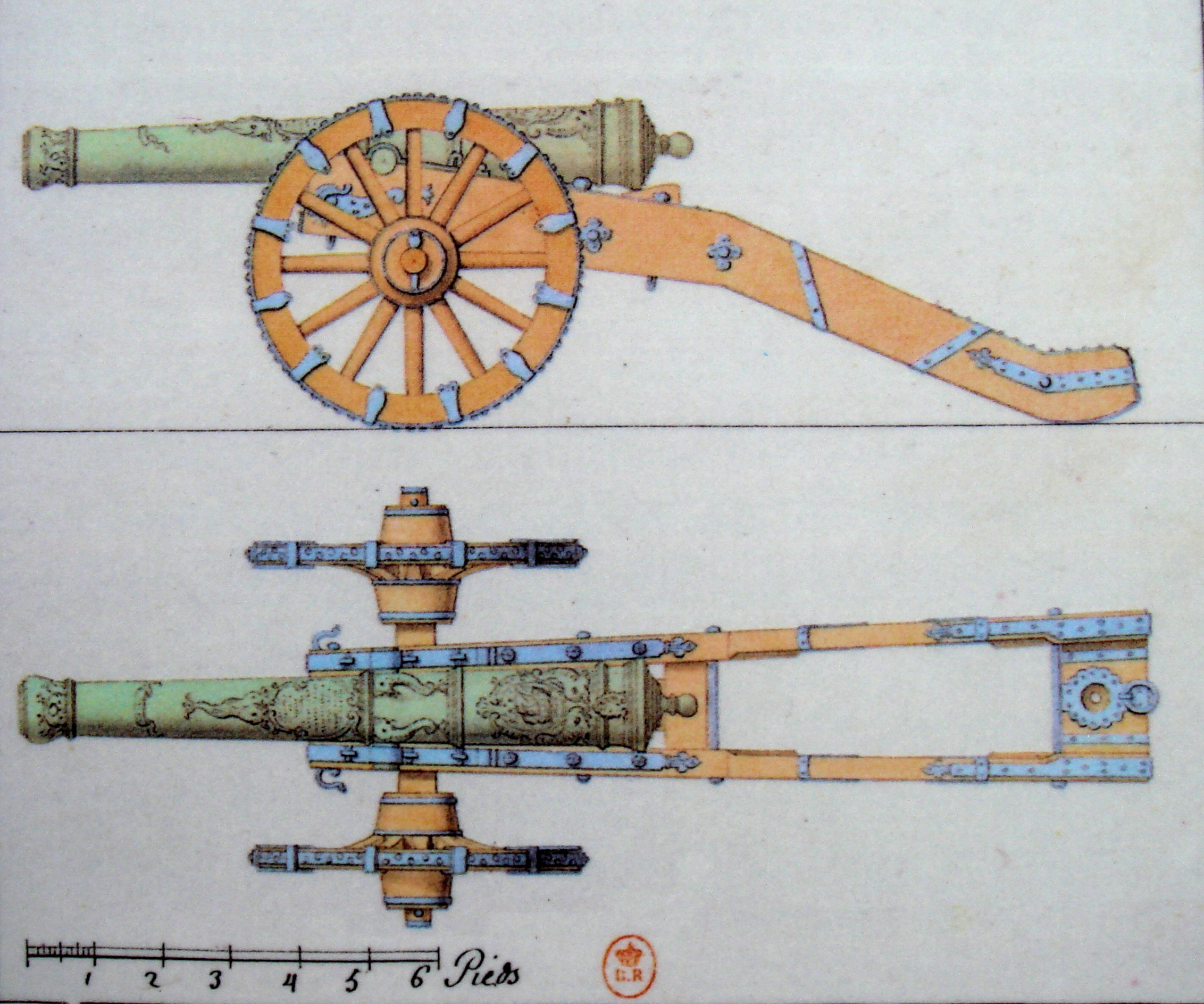
Vallière system cannon

Vallière was promoted maréchal de camp on 1 February 1719 and artillery chief of the Army of Spain that year. He was named Inspector general of the artillery schools on 14 February 1720 and awarded Commander of the Order of Saint Louis on 1 July 1720. He was appointed Director General of Artillery on 22 March 1726. He was appointed a free associate in the Academy of Sciences in 1731. Through the Royal Ordonnance of 7 October 1732, Vallière endeavored to reorganize and standardize the King's artillery. Due to his long experience directing siege artillery, he thought it would be a mistake to create different guns for siege, garrison, and field artillery.

Vallière's new guns were employed for the first time in the War of the Polish Succession (1733–1738). Vallière commanded the artillery of the Army of the Rhine from 1733 through 1735 during the war. He was elevated in rank to lieutenant general on 20 February 1734. He received the Grand Cross of the Order of Saint Louis on 1 June 1739. He fought in the War of the Austrian Succession at the Battle of Dettingen on 27 June 1743. The French under Adrien Maurice de Noailles, 3rd Duke of Noailles bottled up the Pragmatic Army under King George II of Great Britain. The French army was defeated through no fault of Vallière. He took part in the Siege of Fribourg in 1744 but wading through the flooded trenches caused a leg injury that caused him to limp the rest of his life.

During his lifetime, Vallière reputedly took part in 60 sieges and 10 battles. He became an honorary member of the Académie de Marine in 1752. After his death, his seat went to Joseph-Bernard de Chabert-Cogolin. He was appointed governor of the fortress of Bergues St. Vinox in 1749. Vallière died on 6 January 1759 in Paris. (Note: The Academy of Sciences elegy for 1759 stated that he died that year. The Revue placed his death in 1760 (Revue, p. 247).)

== Vallière system (1732–1765) ==
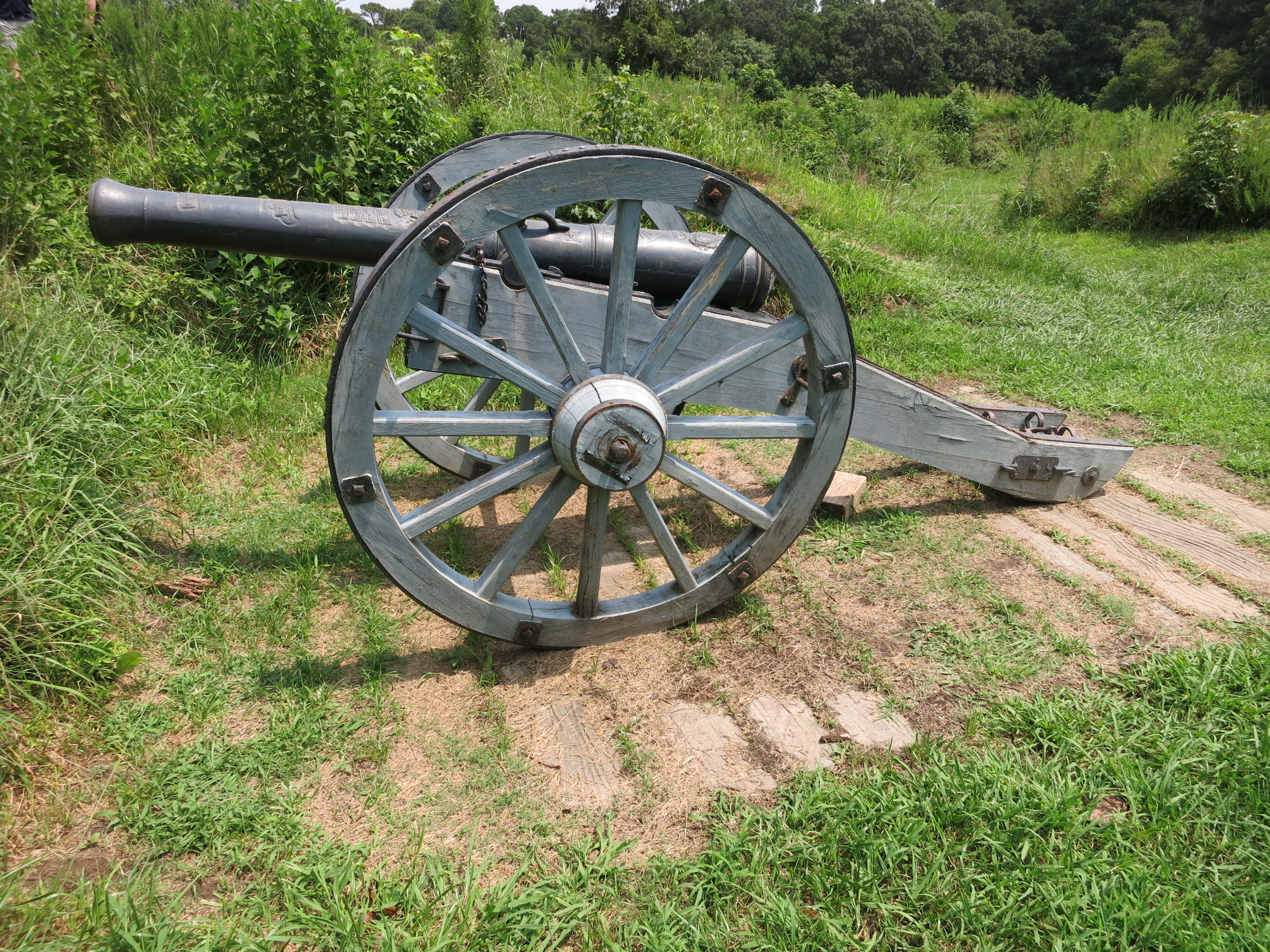
4-pounder Vallière cannon is located at Colonial National Historical Park in Yorktown, Virginia.

The Artillerie de Nouvelle Invention had been incorporated into the French Royal Army by Lieutenant General François Frézeau de La Frézelière. This system had been developed in 1679 by Antonio Gonzales, a Spaniard, and consisted of a range of relatively lightweight cannons. The Artillerie de Nouvelle Invention had recoil problems and was never fully adopted. In any case, the system was discontinued in 1720. Curiously, the system's 4-pounder, 8-pounder, and 12-pounder cannons were very similar in weight to the Gribeauval system's guns of the 1750s. The problem with French artillery of the 1720s was that the cannons were manufactured in several nations and were of many different calibers. Providing for such an assortment of ammunition calibers was a logistical headache.

Vallière significantly improved the method used for founding cannons, superseding the technique developed by Jean-Jacques Keller. He thus developed the Vallière system, which replaced all earlier systems of French artillery. Its primary purpose was to limit the number of calibers and to provide standard gun barrels. All artillery pieces were to be manufactured in France. The new system included 4-pounder, 8-pounder, 12-pounder, 16-pounder, and 24-pounder cannons and 8-inch and 12-inch mortars. The Vallière cannons were very well designed and had good accuracy.

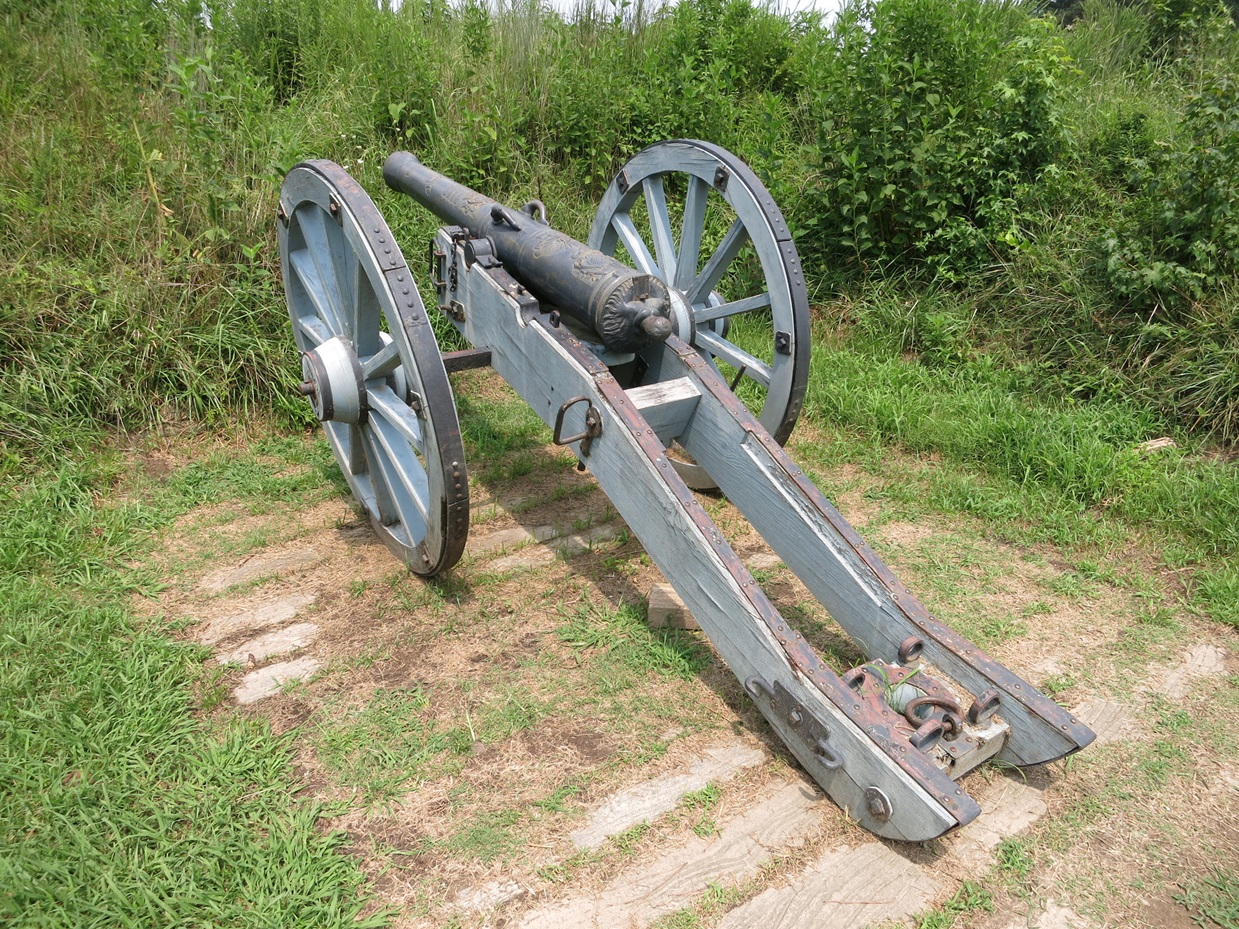
Same 4-pounder Vallière cannon as above showing the sunburst design on the cascabel and other ornamentation on the gun barrel.

For the first decade after its inception, the Vallière system gave good results. As time went on, the Vallière system's limitations became more noticeable. One problem was that there was no differentiation between field guns and siege guns. The 4-pounder, 8-pounder, and 12-pounders were treated as field artillery. However, the guns were really designed for siege warfare, and therefore they were too heavy to maneuver as field artillery. During the War of the Austrian Succession (1740–1748), the lighter Prussian cannons proved to be more mobile, so the French manufactured 50 so-called Swedish or Saxe 4-pounders. These guns were lighter than the Vallière 4-pounders and designed to serve directly with infantry units.

Another problem was that artillery carriages, limbers, and other vehicles were not standardized, so that each arsenal built them to their own specifications. It was found later by experimentation that the guns were using too much gunpowder, and that a smaller charge would accomplish the same results. It was also determined that lighter guns would achieve the same ranges. Meanwhile, Austria greatly improved its guns in 1753 with the Liechtenstein artillery system, and Russia modernized its outdated cannon in 1757 with the Shuvalov artillery system.

In the Seven Years' War (1756–1763), the Prussian and British artillery proved to have superior mobility. Therefore, 100 more Swedish 4-pounders were ordered so that each infantry battalion could be assigned one. The Seven Years' War showed the Vallière system to be obsolete. In 1765, King Louis XV's War Minister Étienne François de Choiseul, Duke of Choiseul authorized Jean-Baptiste Vaquette de Gribeauval to update the French artillery by implementing the Gribeauval system. The Vallière system returned briefly in 1772–1774 under Vallière's son Joseph before it ended forever.

== Notes ==
Footnotes

Citations
