= 6-pounder smoothbore cannon =

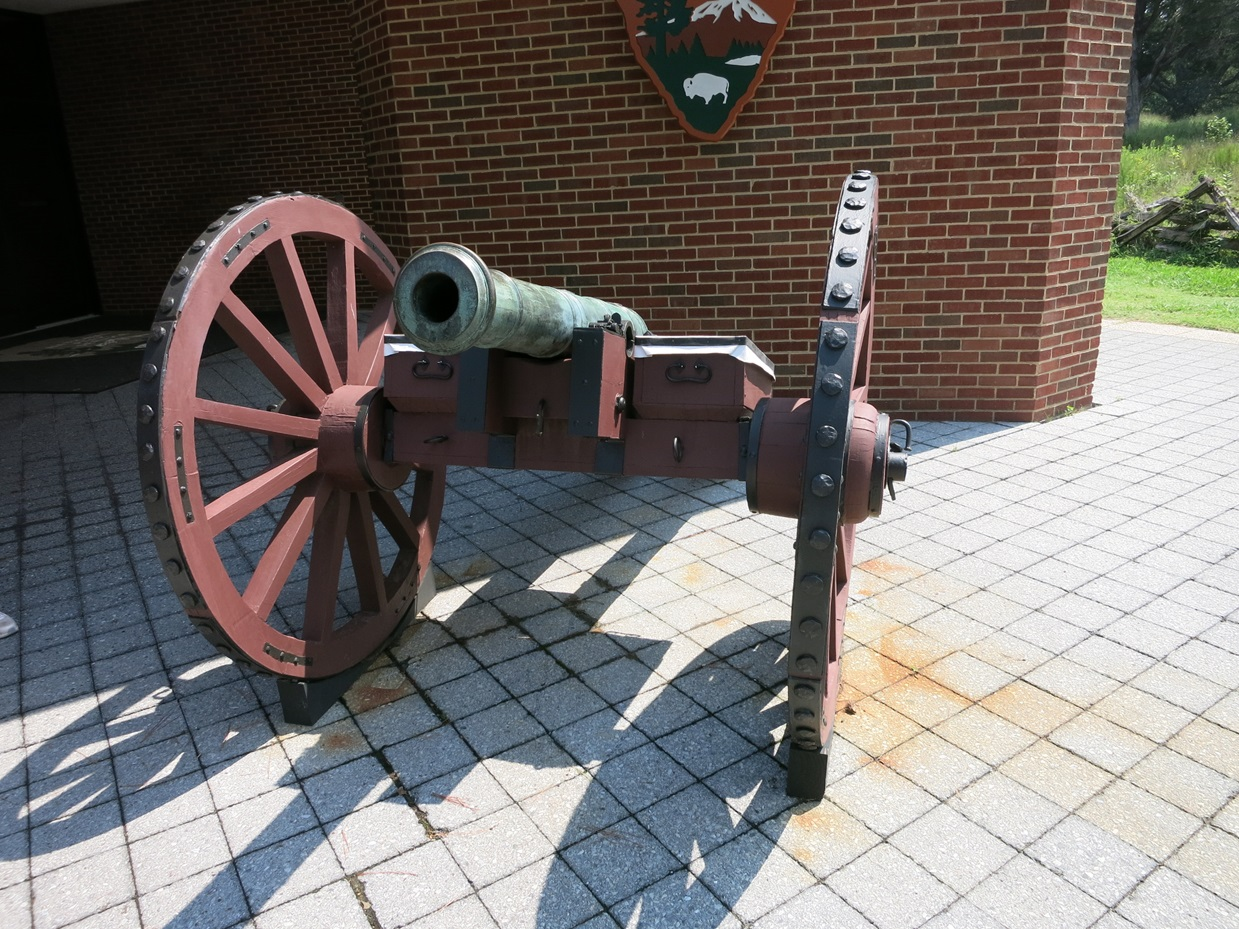
- British 6-pounder cannon at Colonial National Historical Park, Yorktown, Virginia
- Type: Smoothbore cannon

Service history
- In service: 1688–1868
- Used by: Kingdom of England; Kingdom of Great Britain; Kingdom of France; First French Empire; Dutch Republic; Swedish Empire; Kingdom of Prussia; Austrian Empire; Russian Empire; Kingdom of Denmark; United States; Sultanate of Mysore
- Wars: Nine Years' War; War of the Spanish Succession; War of the Polish Succession; War of the Austrian Succession; Seven Years' War; War of the American Revolution; French Revolutionary Wars; Napoleonic Wars; Mexican–American War; American Civil War

Specifications
- Mass: 2,128 lb (965.2 kg) Britain 1735; 880 lb (399.2 kg) USA 1841; 616 lb (279.4 kg) Dieskau 1755; 500 lb (226.8 kg) Britain 1815
- Length: 4.5 to 9.5 ft (1.4 to 2.9 m)
- Shell weight: 6.1 to 6.6 lb (2.8 to 3.0 kg)
- Caliber: 3.67 to 3.79 in (93 to 96 mm)
- Barrels: 1
- Action: Muzzle loading
- Carriage: 900 lb (408.2 kg) USA 1841; 1,280 lb (580.6 kg) Russia 1815
- Rate of fire: 2 shots/minute (sustained)
- Muzzle velocity: 1,450 ft/s (442 m/s)
- Effective firing range: 1,523 yd (1,393 m)

The 6-pounder smoothbore cannon was a muzzleloading field gun that was employed by most European nations and the United States between 1688 and 1868. The cannon was a smoothbore gun that was usually manufactured in bronze but sometimes in cast iron. The term 6-pounder referred to the 6 lb (2.7 kg) weight of the round shot that it fired. Note that different nations had their own definition of the weight of a pound. The gun could fire canister shot and 19th century versions could also fire shrapnel shell and common shell. On the battlefield, several 6-pounder guns might be grouped together in an artillery battery or a pair of 6-pounders might be assigned to assist an infantry battalion. The 6-pounder cannon was sometimes part of an artillery system that also included 3-pounder, 12-pounder, and 24-pounder guns.

== Naming system ==
In 1714, Brigadier General Michael Richards was appointed Surveyor of Ordnance for the Kingdom of Great Britain. Two years later, Richards assigned Albert Borgard to standardize artillery and gun carriages. Borgard dispensed with the old nomenclature and began naming cannons according to the weight of their round shot. Among other changes, the artillery piece formerly called the saker became known as the 6-pounder. Though Borgard's gun designs were not successful, his naming system became standard.

Because nations had different definitions of a pound, there were slight differences in the caliber (diameter of the bore) of a 6-pounder cannon. In Great Britain and the United States, a 6-pounder had a caliber of 3.67 in (93 mm). A 6-pounder gun's caliber was 3.78 in (96 mm) in the Dutch Republic and the Russian Empire, 3.79 in (96 mm) in the Kingdom of France, and 3.75 in (95 mm) in the Kingdom of Portugal.

== History ==
=== Early period ===
An "ordinary" British 6-pounder of the period 1688–1730 was 9.5 ft (2.9 m) in length and weighed 1,500 lb (680 kg). At this period, the great length of a cannon barrel allowed the gun to protrude from the embrasure of a fortress. This prevented the gun's blast from damaging the fortification's stonework. Unfortunately, the cannon's great weight also made it awkward to use as field artillery. Though the cannons were heavy and clumsy, they were found to be too useful for armies to go into action without them. In battles, cannons might be used to silence opposing cannons at long range or to inflict casualties on infantry and cavalry at closer ranges.

In 1692, the English sent to Flanders an artillery train that consisted of 8 demi-culverins (8-pounders), 10 sakers (6-pounders), and 20 3-pounders. The shipment also included 4,000 round shot and 200 canister shot for the 6-pounder. In the Battle of Landen on 29 July 1693 during the Nine Years' War, the French captured 84 of the 91 cannons from the Allied army. The lost artillery included 63 British guns. To replace these losses, English Secretary of State Charles Talbot, 1st Duke of Shrewsbury authorized sending a new artillery train to Flanders that consisted of 10 demi-culverins, 30 sakers, 20 3-pounders, and 4 howitzers. On 14 March 1701 during the War of the Spanish Succession, the British sent 14 sakers, 16 3-pounders, and 4 howitzers to Flanders. Artillery shipped to Portugal included 5 sakers and 1 5¼-pounder in 1703 and 6 sakers in 1704. Typically, the British under Richards assigned 160 round shot and 40 canister shot for each saker.

A battalion gun was a small caliber cannon that was assigned to fight alongside an infantry battalion or regiment. The Swedish Army under Gustavus Adolphus used leather cannons as infantry support guns in the 1630s. A little later, the Swede Lennart Torstensson employed cast iron 4-pounders light enough to be hauled by two horses. The British Army and Dutch Army attached 3-pounders to each infantry battalion as early as the 1690s. In France, François Frézeau de La Frézelière experimented by producing shorter and lighter cannons in the Artillerie de Nouvelle Invention, but his system was suppressed after 1720.

=== Mid-18th century ===
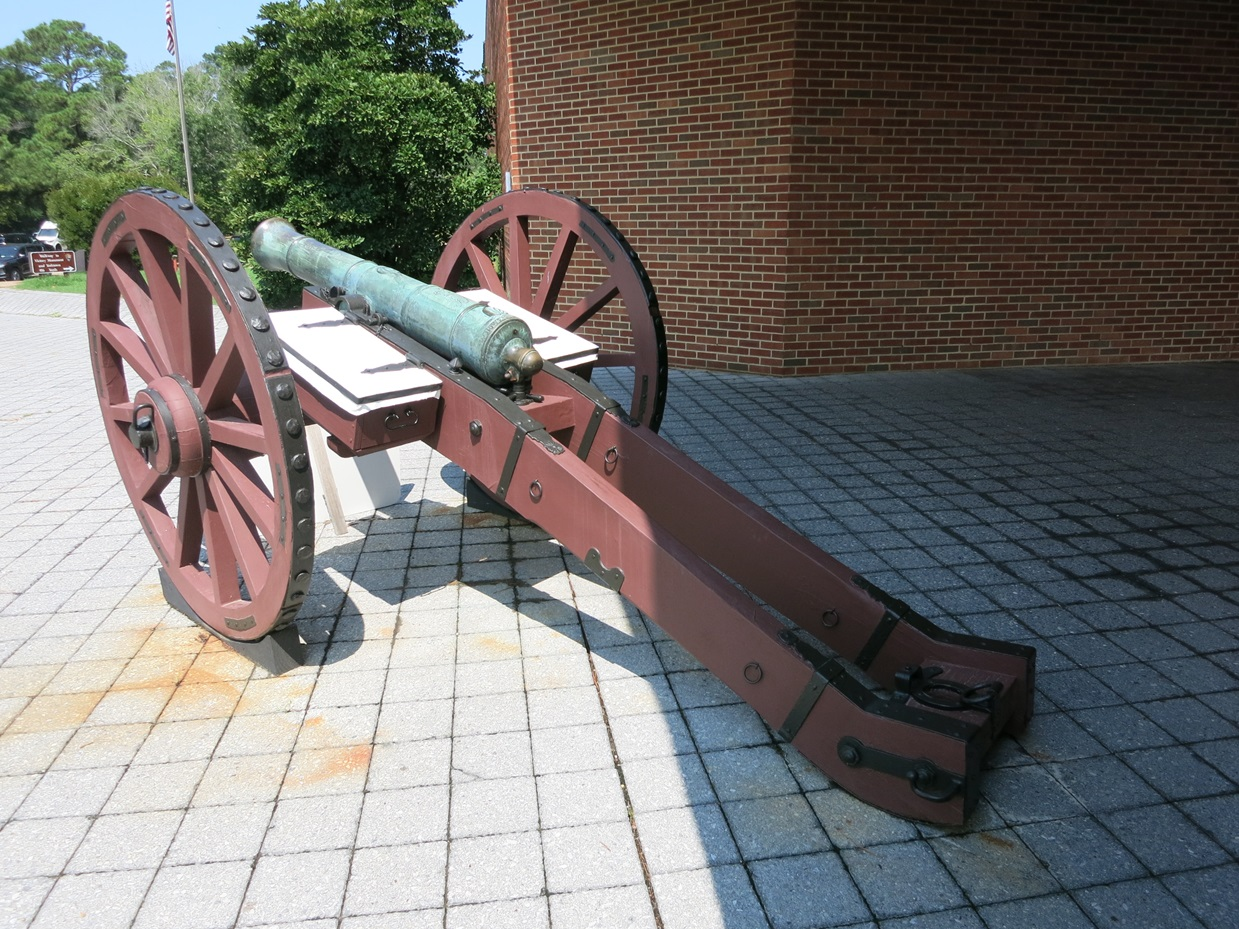
British 6-pounder gun, Yorktown, Va.

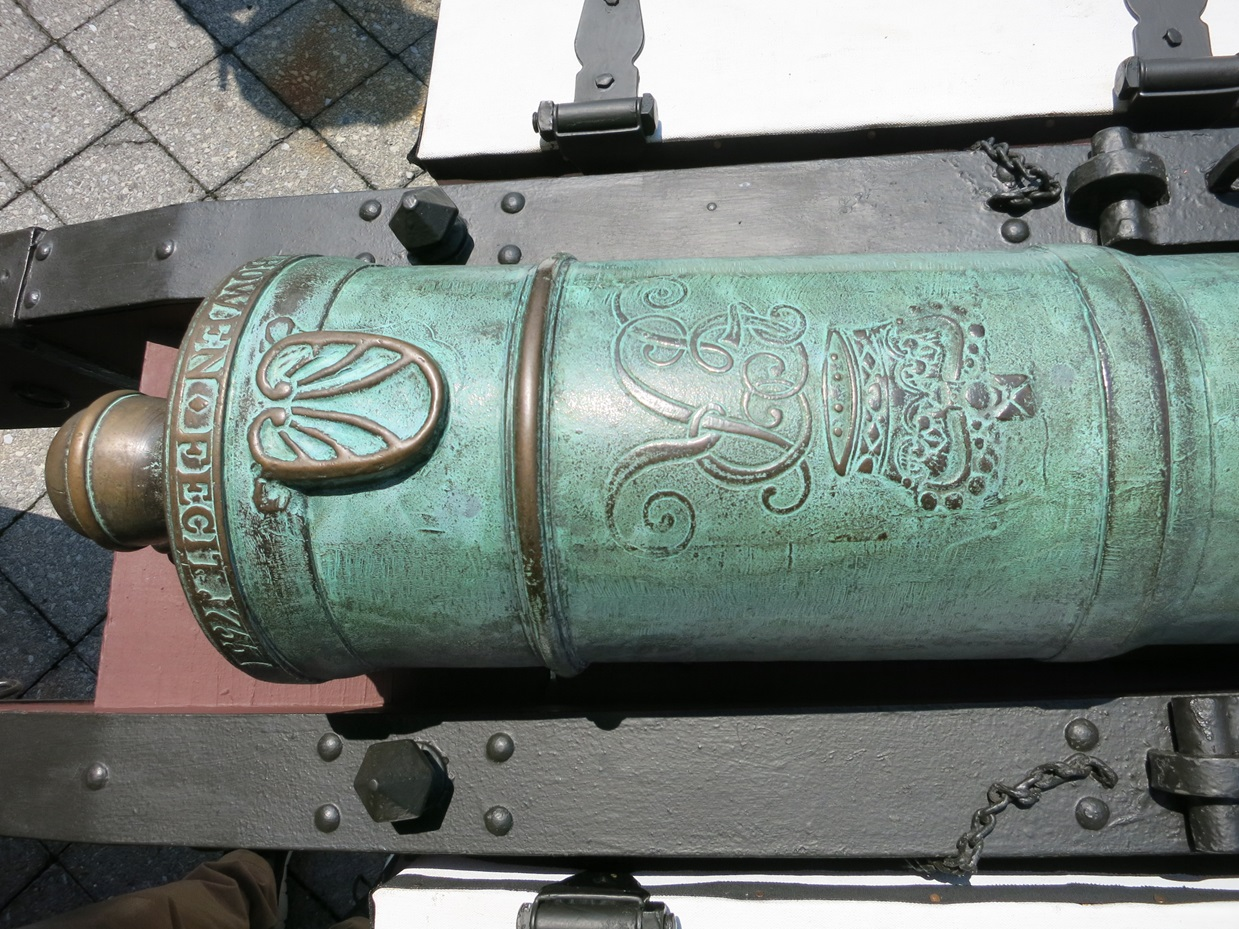
British 6-pounder gun's breech is marked Fecit (founded by) Bowen, 1755.

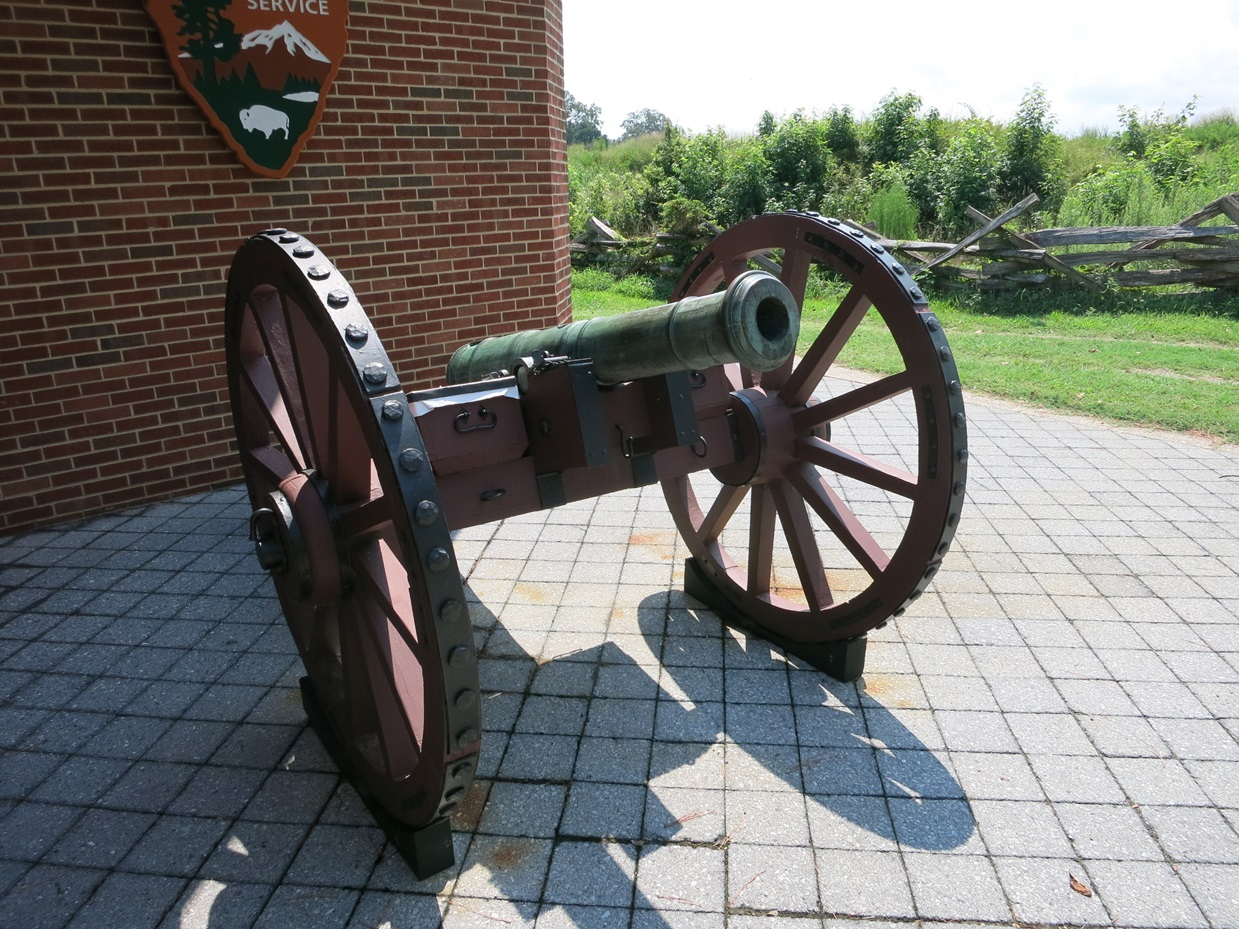
British 6-pounder gun, Yorktown, Va.

The period 1720–1750 was a time of significant changes in European artillery. In 1732, Jean-Florent de Vallière introduced the Vallière system in the French Royal Army. The system did not include a 6-pounder, but it standardized all French cannons to the calibers 4-pounder, 8-pounder, 12-pounder, 16-pounder, 24-pounder. The Vallière cannons were designed to be all-purpose guns, but they were only suitable for siege work and too ponderous to be effective as field artillery. The French gunner Bernard Forest de Bélidor discovered that a gunpowder charge could be reduced to one-third of its previous weight without losing its effectiveness or range. This allowed gun barrels to be produced that were significantly lighter.

In 1730, Christian Nicolaus von Linger reduced the calibers of the Prussian Army to 3-pounders, 6-pounders, 12-pounders, and 24-pounders. The Prussians used both the 3-pounder and 6-pounder as battalion guns. Believing the existing 6-pounder was too heavy, in 1742 Frederick the Great had two light 3-pounders assigned to every regiment. In 1755, the Prussian Army adopted a 6-pounder designed by Karl Wilhelm von Dieskau that weighed only 616 lb (279.4 kg). However, the Dieskau 6-pounder lacked the range and accuracy of the new Austrian guns and new, heavier 6-pounders had to be cast.

During the War of the Austrian Succession, Habsburg Austria found its artillery badly out-of-date. The Austrian Director General of artillery Joseph Wenzel I, Prince of Liechtenstein introduced the Liechtenstein artillery system in 1753. The new system included new 3-pounder, 6-pounder, and 12-pounder field artillery and new gunner training schools. These improvements made Austrian artillery the best in Europe during the Seven Years' War. In 1780, a 6-pounder suitable for use with cavalry batteries was developed.

In 1757, Peter Ivanovich Shuvalov introduced the Shuvalov artillery system in the Russian Empire. Its field artillery included the 3-pounder, 6-pounder, 8-pounder, and 12-pounder. Though its cannons were a big improvement, the Shuvalov system guns remained inferior to the Austrian and Prussian artillery.

At the Battle of Fontenoy on 11 May 1745, the British 6-pounders fired at the French artillery, while the 3-pounders served as battalion guns. At the Battle of Culloden on 16 April 1746, the British had ten short 6-pounders. These fired so effectively that they provoked an unsuccessful charge by the Highlander army. In 1735, the British arsenal included an 8 ft (2.4 m) long 6-pounder that weighed 2,128 lb (965.2 kg) and was used until the 1770s. By the 1740s, shorter and lighter 6-pounders were introduced such as a medium gun 5 ft (1.5 m) long that weighed 1,148 lb (520.7 kg) and a light gun 4.5 ft (1.4 m) long that weighed 532 lb (241.3 kg). In the 1770s, William Belford designed a 6-pounder that was 5 ft (1.5 m) long and weighed 616 lb (279.4 kg).

Starting in the 18th century, cannons made of bronze became standard for field artillery. Note that bronze cannons were often incorrectly referred to as brass. Artillery officers preferred cannons made of bronze over those made with cast iron. Though iron was cheaper, it was also heavier than bronze and more brittle. Iron guns were liable to develop cracks and be prone to bursting. Though more expensive, bronze guns enjoyed a longer service life and were safer for gun crews. In 1777, trials in Vienna showed that a well-made bronze gun could be fired 6,000–7,000 times. Iron was more commonly used for the heavy siege and fortress cannons.

=== Napoleonic era ===
In 1765, Jean-Baptiste Vaquette de Gribeauval designed the Gribeauval system which would give France the best field artillery during the French Revolutionary Wars and Napoleonic Wars. Like the Vallière system, it did not include a 6-pounder. Instead, it incorporated a new 4-pounder, 8-pounder, and 12-pounder. In 1803, at the instigation of Auguste de Marmont, France produced a 6-pounder as part of the Year XI system. The Year XI system was never fully implemented, but its new 6-pounder was manufactured in significant numbers. The French 6-pounder weighed 859.8 lb (390 kg), fired a round shot weighing 6.6 lb (3.0 kg), and its barrel length was 17 calibers long. The sustained rate of fire for a 6-pounder was two rounds per minute.

6-pounder cannons employed by European nations in 1815
Nation	Caliber	Gunpowder charge lb (kg)	Barrel length in calibers	Tube Weight lb (kg)	Carriage Wgt lb (kg)
Austria	6-pounder	1.5 (0.7)	16	824 (374)	-
Britain	Medium 6-pounder	2.0 (0.9)	18	875 (397)	-
Britain	Belford's 6-pounder	1.5 (0.7)	16	660 (299) (Note: Pivka gave Belford's 6-pounder a weight of 550 lbs on page 21 and 660 lbs on page 23. The latter weight seems more accurate.)	1,046 (474)
Britain	Light 6-pounder	1.5 (0.7)	14	500 (227)	-
Denmark	6-pounder	2.5 (1.1)	22	1,200 (544)	1,200 (544)
Prussia	Heavy 6-pounder	2.25 (1.0)	22	1,617 (733)	-
Prussia	Light 6-pounder	2.25 (1.0)	18	935 (424)	1,132 (513)
Russia	6-pounder	2.0 (0.9)	18	880 (399)	1,280 (581)

In 1809, an Austrian 6-pounder had a range of 1,200 paces or 1,000 yd (914 m), using round shot and even farther with ricochet. The gun fired 3 oz (85 g) canister shot a distance of 600 paces or 500 yd (457 m). Each 6-pounder carried 94 round shot and 26 canister shot in its limber box and ammunition carts. More ammunition was carried in the reserve artillery park. By 1809, battalion guns were discontinued in the Austrian army; the 6-pounders were massed in eight-gun batteries to support infantry brigades. Four 6-pounders joined with two 7-pounder howitzers formed a corps artillery reserve battery or a cavalry battery. All Austrian batteries were made up of 4 officers, 14 non-commissioned officers (NCOs), 2 musicians, and 150 enlisted men.

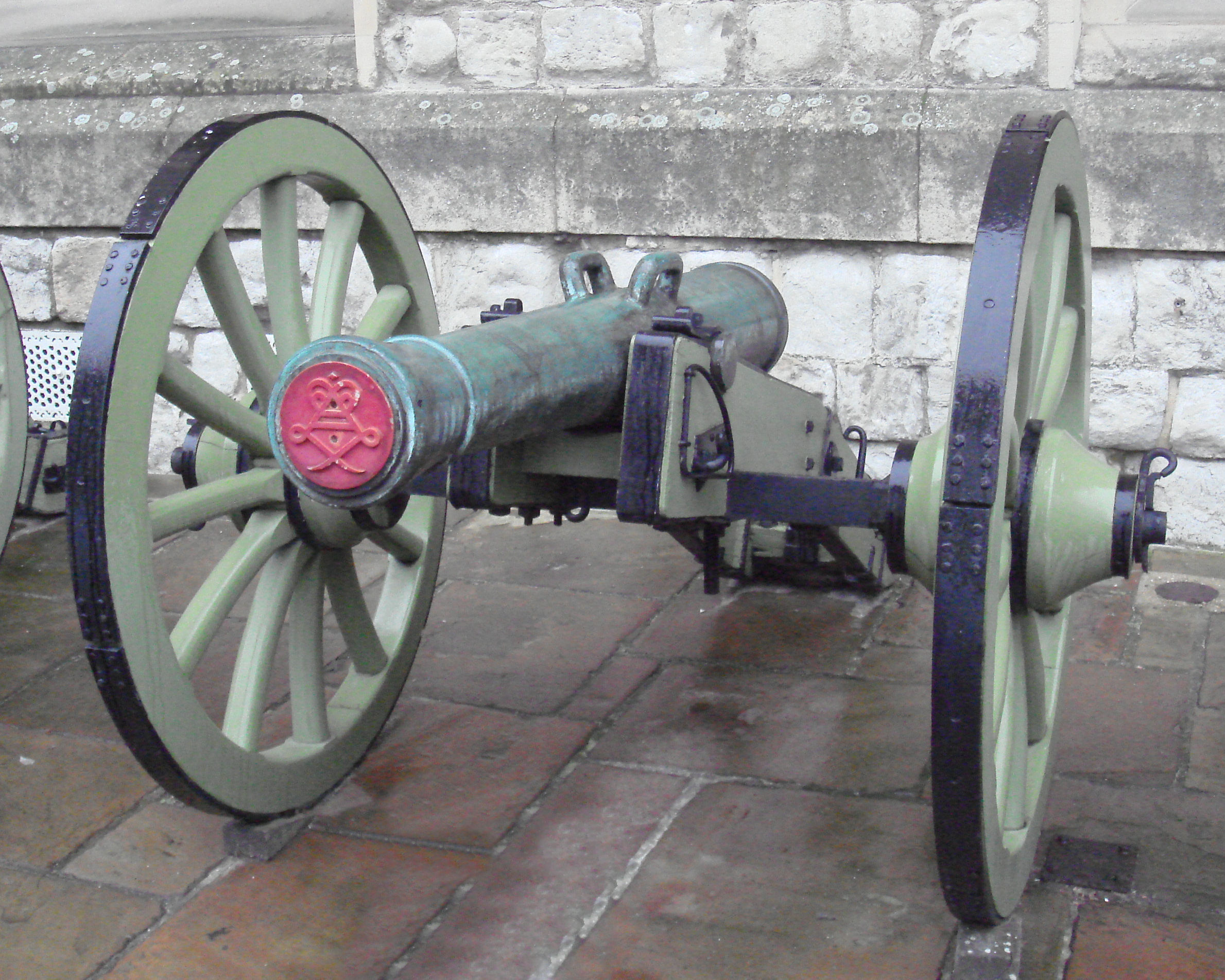
A French 6-pounder gun captured by the British at the Battle of Waterloo.

A French foot artillery company included six cannons and two howitzers, while a horse artillery company was made up of four cannons and two howitzers. This organization was used whether the guns were System XI 6-pounders or other cannons. Each 6-pounder had three caissons (ammunition wagons) attached of which one went into action with the gun and two stayed with the artillery park. In addition, 21 round shot were carried in the gun's trail chest. A French foot artillery company comprised 5 officers, 6 NCOs, 1 drummer, and 81 enlisted men. A horse artillery company included 4 officers, 5 NCOs, 2 trumpeters, and 65 enlisted men.

At this period, a British battery typically consisted of five 6-pounders and one 5½-inch howitzer. In 1813–1814, the 9-pounder began to replace the 6-pounder. A foot artillery battery included 5 officers, 8 NCOs, 3 drummers, and 125 enlisted men. A Royal Horse Artillery battery was made up of 5 officers, 8 NCOs, 1 trumpeter, and 146 enlisted men. In 1805, the Russians adopted the Arakcheyev artillery system to replace the outdated Shuvalov system. Of the cannons, only the 6-pounder and 12-pounder were retained. Russian batteries were enormous, having twelve or fourteen artillery pieces, divided between cannons and licornes.

== 19th century ==
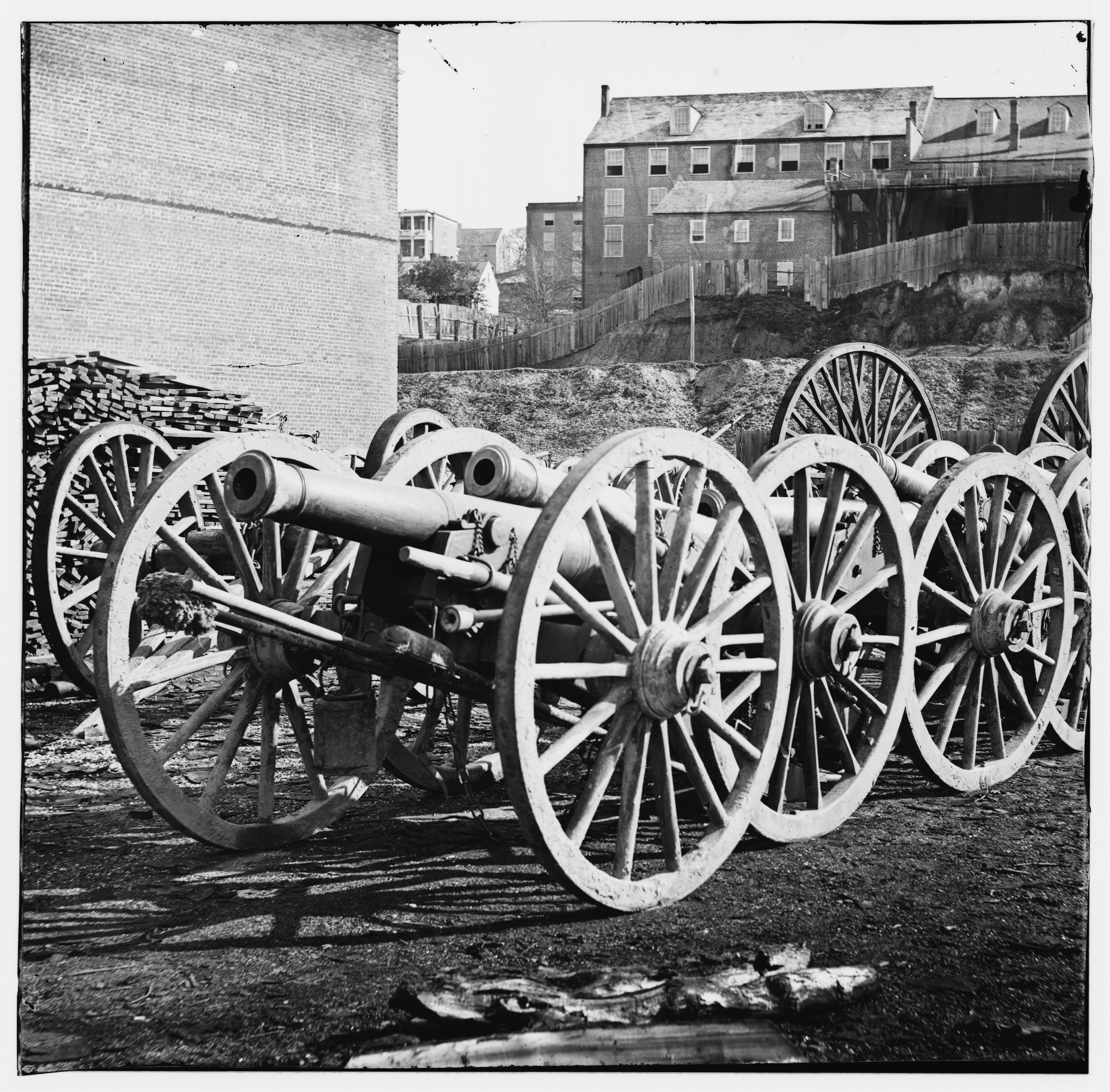
M1841 6-pounder field guns

In 1800, the United States lacked copper and tin mines, the elements needed for making bronze. Because of this shortage, the Secretary of War urged that cannons be manufactured from cast iron. What followed was a period of repeated failures to produce a reliable cast iron 6-pounder gun. In 1831, Alexander Macomb's Ordnance Board decided that bronze should be used to cast cannons. The eventual result was a family of cannons that included the M1841 6-pounder field gun. Over 850 bronze Model 1841 6-pounders were cast, plus nearly 200 variants including Models 1835, 1838, and 1840. The last Model 1841 6-pounder was manufactured in 1862 though the gun was not officially suppressed by the United States Army until 1868.

The Model 1841 6-pounder had a tube weight of 880 lb (399.2 kg) and length of 5 ft (1.5 m). Its bore diameter was 3.67 in (93 mm). The gun carriage weighed 900 lb (408.2 kg). The 6-pounder fired a 6.1 lb (2.8 kg) solid shot a distance of 1,523 yd (1,393 m) at 5° elevation. Its muzzle velocity was 1,450 ft/s (442 m/s). It could also fire canister shot, shrapnel shell, and common shell. The 6-pounder field gun proved to be highly effective in the Mexican-American War when pitted against less mobile Mexican artillery.

American Civil War combat experience quickly showed that 6-pounder field guns were no longer effective weapons. Nevertheless, the 6-pounder was used by both the Union Army and the Confederate States Army early in the war. In 1861, George B. McClellan, commander of the Union Army of the Potomac in the Eastern theater, insisted that all of the Model 1841 smoothbore guns be replaced by M1857 12-pounder Napoleons, 3-inch Ordnance rifles, and Parrott rifles. By the Battle of Antietam in September 1862, the Army of the Potomac had no 6-pounders while its Confederate opponents employed at least 45 of the cannons. In the Western theater, the 6-pounder was used by both sides on a limited scale until the end of the war. As late as 30 June 1863, the 6-pounder still appeared in the ordnance returns with 24 belonging to the Department of the Cumberland and 8 belonging to the Department of the Ohio.

== Notes ==
Footnotes

Citations
