= Shuvalov artillery system =

Russian artillery system

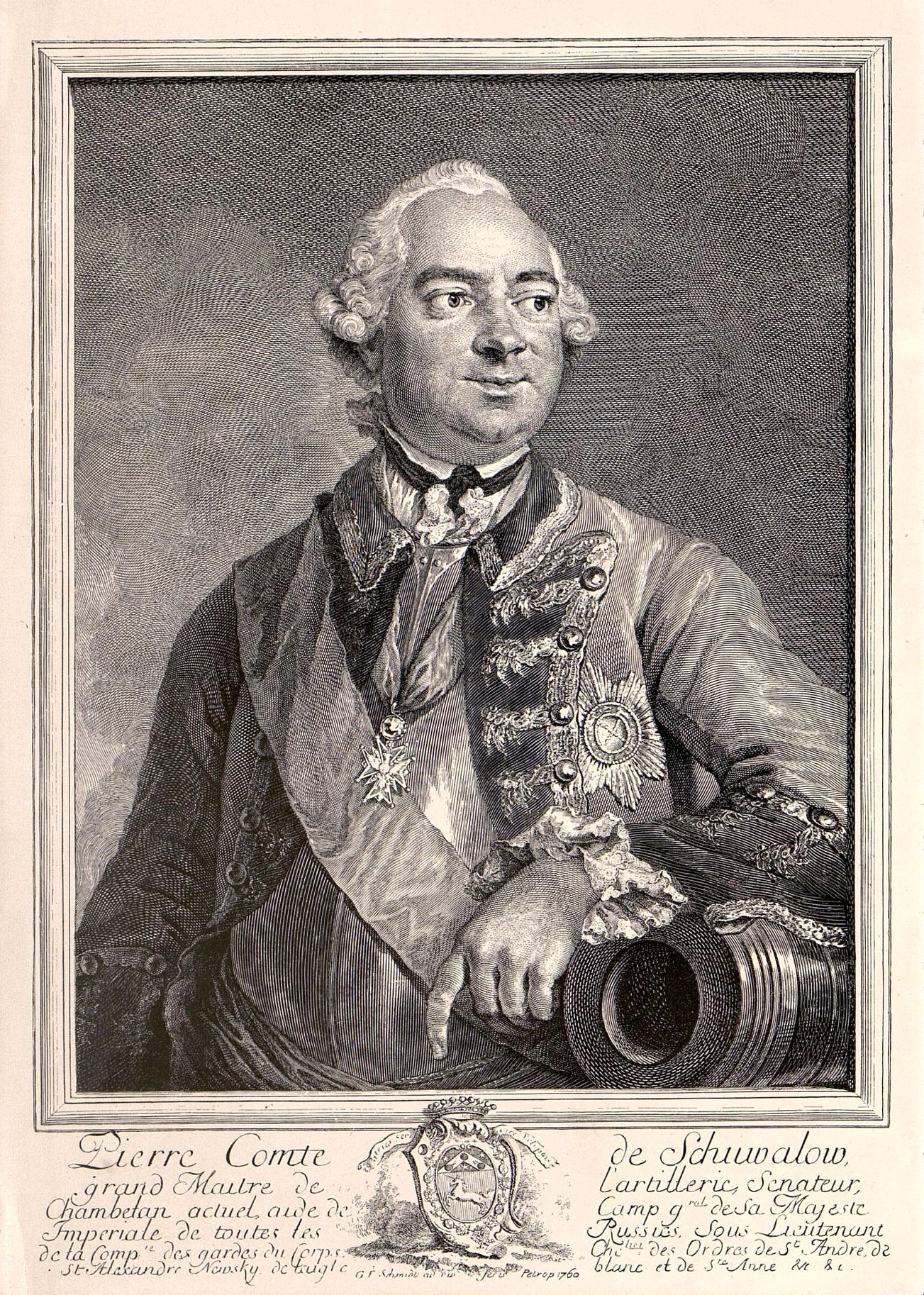
- Peter Shuvalov is shown with his arm resting on a cannon.
- Type: Artillery
- Place of origin: Russia

Service history
- In service: 1757–1808
- Used by: Russia
- Wars: Seven Years' War; French Revolutionary Wars; Napoleonic Wars

Production history
- Designer: Peter Shuvalov
- Designed: 1756

The Shuvalov artillery system was a system of artillery and organization introduced by Peter Ivanovich Shuvalov and adopted by the Russian Empire in the mid-18th century. The system was in use during the Seven Years' War and the French Revolutionary Wars and began to be replaced in 1805 during Napoleonic Wars, by the Arakcheyev artillery system. Not only were new cannons manufactured, but a new artillery organization was created and gunners underwent technical training. In addition, Shuvalov introduced a new type of artillery piece: the licorne, a type of gun-howitzer.

== Background ==
One of the most productive periods in the development of field artillery occurred during the period 1740–1815. Christian Nicolaus von Linger standardized the artillery of the Kingdom of Prussia in 1731 so that there were only four calibers, 3-pounder, 6-pounder, 12-pounder, and 24-pounder. In 1732, Florent-Jean de Vallière also standardized the artillery of the Kingdom of France by implementing the Vallière system. This was done by reducing calibers to 4-pounder, 8-pounder, 12-pounder, 16-pounder, and 24-pounder cannons. Unfortunately for France, Vallière designed all the guns as siege artillery, not field artillery. This caused the smaller guns to be too heavy to be easily employed as field artillery. The French also failed to standardize their artillery limbers and caissons as well as gun carriages.

During the War of Austrian Succession (1740–1748) the Habsburg Monarchy found its artillery was completely outclassed by the Prussian artillery. Therefore, Joseph Wenzel I, Prince of Liechtenstein developed the Liechtenstein artillery system which standardized Austrian field artillery to include 3-pounder, 6-pounder, and 12-pounder cannons, and 1-pounder and 7-pounder howitzers. Austria's heavy artillery comprised long 12-pounder, 18-pounder, and 24-pounder siege guns, plus four different calibers of mortars. Liechtenstein also reorganized the Austrian artillery establishment, set up an artillery school for gunners, and standardized artillery vehicles and parts. During the Seven Years' War, the Prussians discovered to their alarm that the Austrian artillery's accuracy and range was greatly improved. It was during these developments that Shuvalov was appointed as Russia's Master General of the Ordnance in 1756.

== New system ==
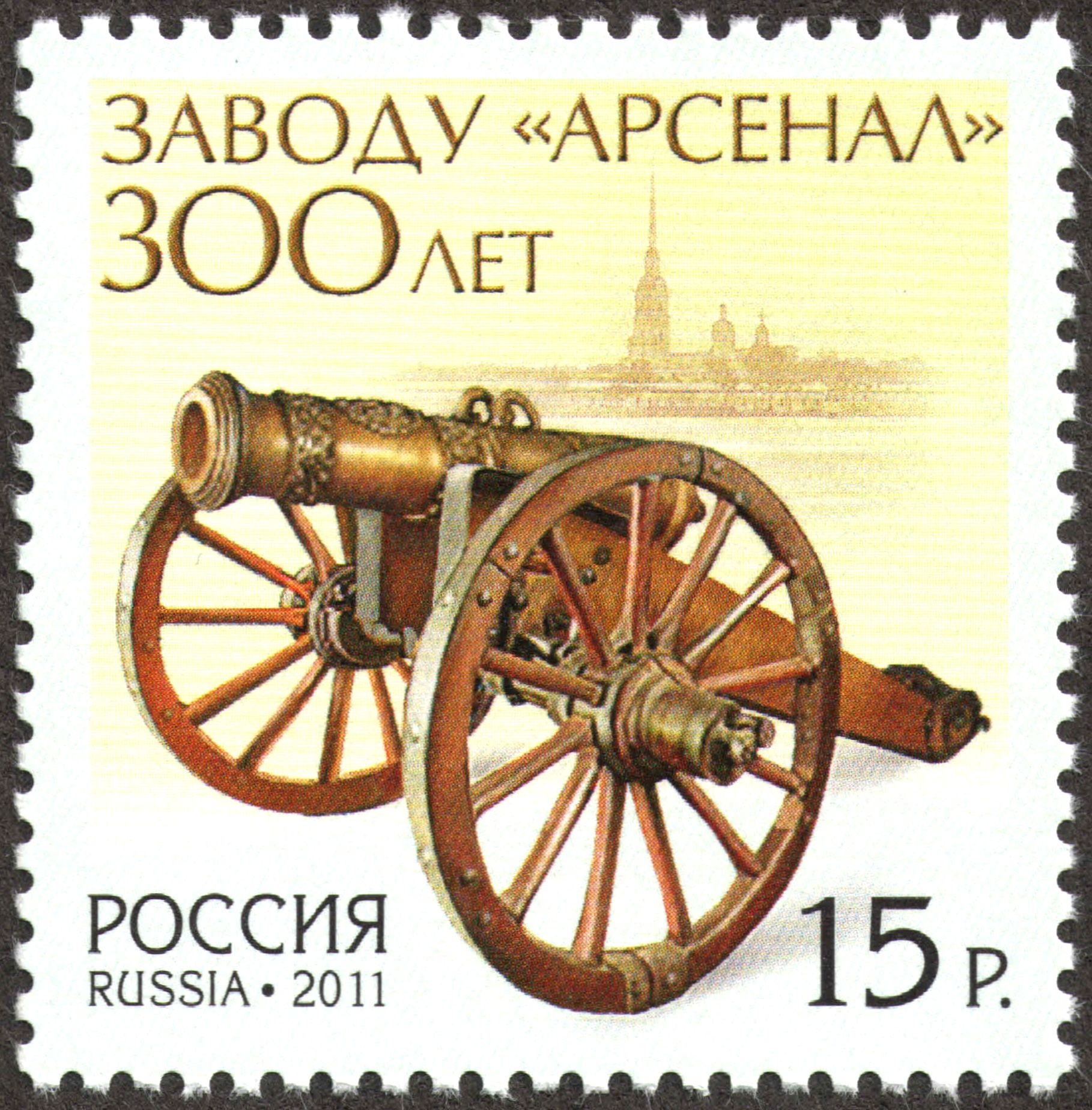
Russian stamp shows a licorne from the Shuvalov system. Note the ornamentation on the barrel.

As early as 1755, Shuvalov was placed in charge of the manufacture of artillery pieces. Aside from overseeing the production of cannons, he set up an up-to-date artillery training program. He also oversaw new artillery regulations and reorganized the Russian artillery. He developed the licorne, also known as a unicorn, a gun-howitzer hybrid. The howitzers of the mid-18th century were short-barreled and fired on a higher arc than cannons. Licornes had a longer barrel and were not able to fire on an arc as high as a typical howitzer. The licorne's ammunition cart carried 80 shells, 30 canister shot, and 10 firebombs.

On 11 January 1757, the new Russian artillery organization was implemented, divided into four major divisions. The first division was the field artillery, which was divided between the Field Artillery Regiment and the Regimental Artillery Regiment. The latter organization manned the guns which were assigned to the infantry regiments. In European armies, these were called battalion guns and were usually 3-pounders or 4-pounders that operated with infantry units. While the French suppressed battalion guns by 1800, the Russians continued to use them until 1813. The second division was the Observation Corps artillery. The third division was the Secret Howitzer Corps. The fourth division was the siege artillery which was divided among three different locations: Saint Petersburg, Kiev (Kyiv), and Belgorod. The Saint Petersburg establishment had a mobile siege train.

The cannon calibers were 3-pounder, 6-pounder, 8-pounder, 12-pounder, 18-pounder, and 24-pounder. There were 20-pounder and 40-pounder licornes. There was a 6-pounder coehorn mortar, and 80-pounder, 200-pounder, and 360-pounder mortars. Each ammunition cart for the cannons hauled 120 round shot and 30 canister shot. The so-called Secret Howitzer had an oval-shaped bore that was designed to fire a canister round that contained 168 lead balls, each weighing 2 oz (0.06 kg). Unfortunately, the Secret Howitzer was difficult to load, and by 1780 it was suppressed. In 1757, there were 12,937 artillerists and engineers in the Russian army. The artillery train consisted of 2,052 officers and men and 4,461 horses. (Note: Note that by 1800, the licornes of the field artillery were 10-pounders and 20-pounders (Pivka 1979, p. 24). Gunther E. Rothenberg wrote that the licornes were 9-pounders and 18-pounders (Rothenberg 1980, p. 200).)

== Caliber ==
Caliber is normally measured as the inner diameter, or bore, of the gun barrel. However, in the 1700s, caliber was often expressed as the weight of a round shot. The calibers of Russian and British cannons are different, as shown below. Note that the Russian pound was slightly larger than the English pound.

Characteristics: Russian vs. English gun calibers
Nation	Shot weight	Caliber
Russia	6-pounder	3.78 in (96 mm)
Russia	12-pounder	4.76 in (121 mm)
Russia	18-pounder	5.45 in (138 mm)
Russia	24-pounder	6.00 in (152 mm)
Great Britain	6-pounder	3.67 in (93 mm)
Great Britain	12-pounder	4.62 in (117 mm)
Great Britain	18-pounder	5.29 in (134 mm)
Great Britain	24-pounder	5.82 in (148 mm)

== Shortcomings ==
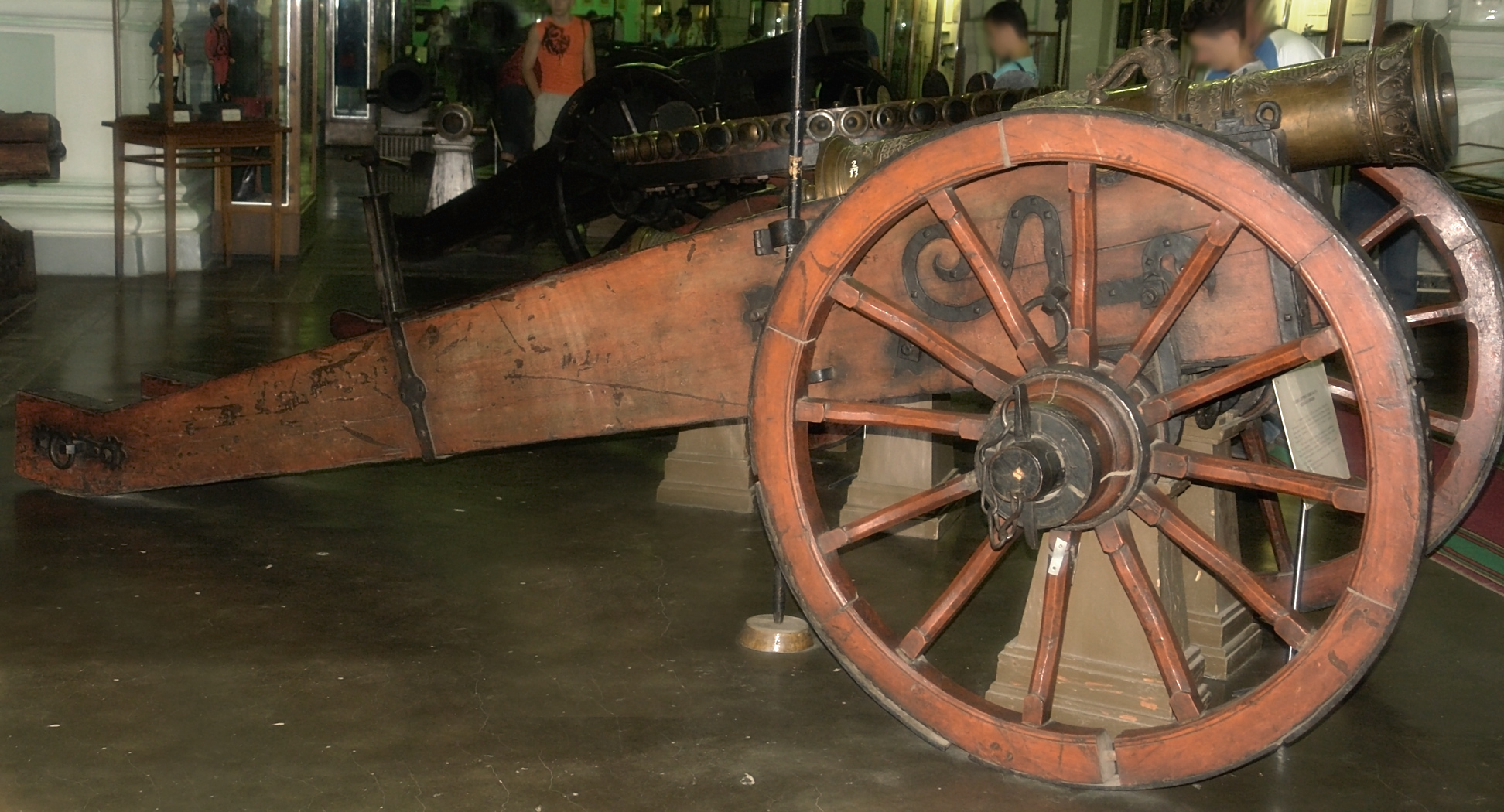
Model 1753 Shuvalov licorne

The Russian artillery pieces were heavier than the guns used by Austria and Prussia. The manufacture of gun carriages was not standardized so that each artillery regiment had their own design. Parts were not standardized and there was no quality control. Though an improvement in Russian artillery, the system was inferior to Austria's Liechtenstein artillery system. Louis Alexandre Andrault de Langeron noted that most artillery officers were not well educated and that the artillery schools did not train enough officers. In the 1790s, Langeron wrote that Russian guns were too heavy and the gunners were poorly trained. However, they could fire the cannons rapidly, which led to low accuracy. Another problem was that the most accurate Russian gun sight had to be removed from the cannon before firing. In 1800, Tsar Paul I of Russia stopped artillery training for officers. The Russian artillery in 1799 was very numerous. A British observer, Robert Wilson noted that, "No other army moves with so many guns". The Shuvalov system remained in use until the Russian artillery performed poorly at the Battle of Austerlitz in 1805. This prompted Russia to adopt a new artillery system under the direction of Aleksey Arakcheyev called the Arakcheyev artillery system.

== Notes ==
Footnotes

Citations
