= Peter Shuvalov =

Peter Shuvalov may refer to:

- Peter Ivanovich Shuvalov (1711–1762), Russian statesman and field marshal
- Pyotr Andreyevich Shuvalov (1827–1889), Russian statesman and counselor to Tsar Alexander II
