= Arakcheyev artillery system =

Russian artillery system

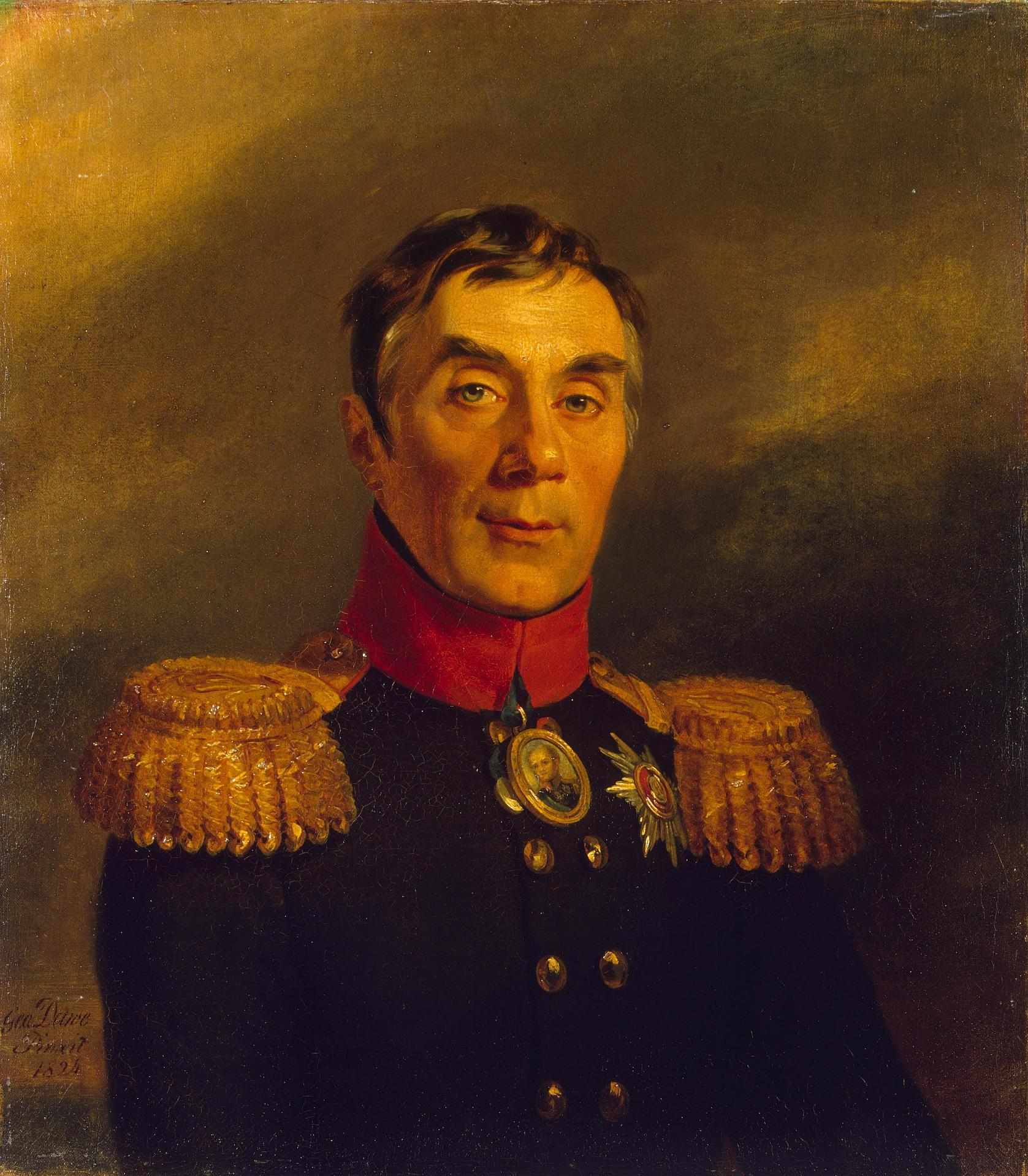
- Alexey Andreevich Arakcheyev
- Type: Artillery
- Place of origin: Russian Empire

Service history
- In service: since 1808
- Used by: Russian Empire
- Wars: Napoleonic Wars

Production history
- Designer: Aleksey Arakcheyev
- Designed: 1805

The Arakcheyev artillery system or Artillery system of 1805 was a new system of artillery and organization introduced by Aleksey Arakcheyev and adopted by the Russian Empire in the early 19th century. The system came into use during the Napoleonic Wars after the Russian artillery performed poorly on the battlefield and the old Shuvalov artillery system proved inadequate. A new artillery organization was created, and new artillery doctrine began to appear starting in 1808. Arakcheyev was personally vindictive and harsh toward subordinates, but he excelled as an administrator and a gunner. Although French artillery employment on the battlefield remained superior, the Russian artillery nevertheless made great strides during the period 1808–1815.

== Background ==
The Shuvalov artillery system of 1756 established a new organization of the Russian artillery, standardized gun calibers, and created a training program for gunners. It also introduced the licorne, a hybrid combination of gun and howitzer. The system featured 3-pounder, 6-pounder, 8-pounder, and 12-pounder field artillery, 20-pounder and 40-pounder licornes, 18-pounder and 24-pounder siege artillery, and four different mortars. Russian guns at this period were generally heavier than those of other European countries. The Shuvalov system was a big improvement, but it was not as good as Austria's Liechtenstein artillery system.

In the 1790's, Louis Alexandre Andrault de Langeron wrote that Russian guns were too heavy and the gunners were badly trained. He remarked that the three cadet schools did not train enough artillery officers. Langeron noted that the gunners could fire rapidly, but their accuracy was poor. The gunners were not trained to maneuver, and horses were not issued to artillery units until right before going to war. In 1800, Tsar Paul I of Russia removed artillery instruction from the cadet schools and training was not restored until 1808. Though there were improvements starting in 1800, Russian commanders regarded artillery as a defensive weapon. Because of a shortage of senior artillery officers, guns were assigned to infantry commanders who used artillery to try to silence enemy artillery. A battery commander might be harshly punished if he lost any guns.

== New system ==
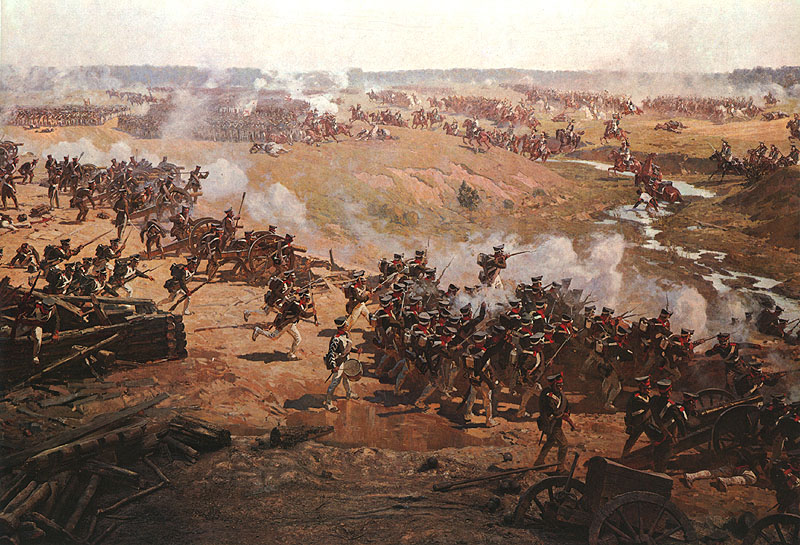
Detail from the Borodino Panorama shows Russian cannons firing at the left of center.

The Russian artillery's poor performance at the Battle of Austerlitz on 2 December 1805 inspired Arakcheyev to implement reforms. For the field artillery, Arakcheyev introduced new 6-pounder and 12-pounder cannons plus 10-pounder and 20-pounder licornes. There was also a 3-pounder licorne, but it was found to be ineffective and discontinued in 1810. The old wedge system for elevating the guns was discarded and replaced by the screw quoin which had been developed by Prussia in the 1740s. Gun carriages were copied from the 1750s Austrian system. The gunsight was improved but needed to be removed before firing the gun. Starting in 1807, Russian gunners began to de-emphasize counterbattery firing and focus more on targeting the enemy infantry. Mikhail Kutuzov published General Rules for Field Artillery in Field Action which stated that it was not a disgrace to lose guns that were lost while firing at the enemy.

Author Kevin F. Kiley wrote that Arakcheyev was a "difficult and demanding taskmaster" who was the "driving force" behind the reform of the Russian artillery. Arakcheyev enjoyed a close relationship with Tsar Paul who appointed him as Inspector of Russian Artillery in early 1799. He was later banished to his estates for financial misconduct but reinstated in the position by Tsar Alexander I of Russia in 1803. Arakcheyev was highly focused on artillery reform and intolerant of failure. He was an excellent administrator, not a field commander. He deserved credit for the improvements in Russian artillery despite his personal shortcomings. These included being rude, unpleasant, cruel to subordinates, and vengeful toward officers who disobeyed or opposed him. Historian Gunther E. Rothenberg considered Arakcheyev, who was Minister of War in 1808–1810, to be brutal and reactionary, yet a good artillerist.

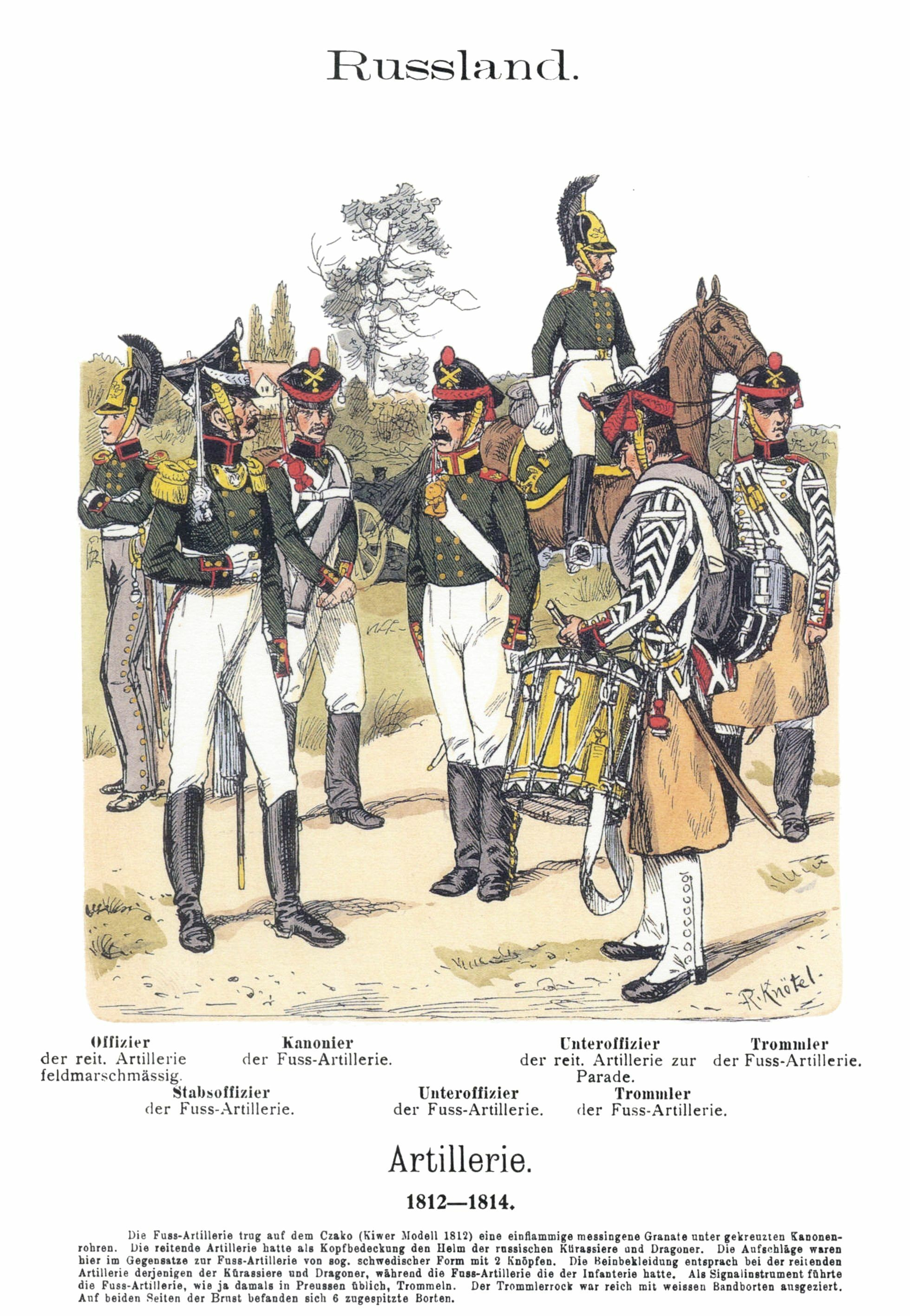
Russian artillerymen, 1812–1814

During the period after 1796, Russia repeatedly reorganized their artillery, so that by 1800, there was 1 regiment of horse artillery and 7 regiments of foot artillery. Each artillery battery was typically made up of 8 cannons and 4 licornes. Later, in 1805, there were 8 cannons and 6 licornes per battery. In 1806 after another reorganization, there were 18 artillery brigades. During the fighting in 1805–1807, Russian artillery tactics were outmoded. There was no cooperation between gunners and infantry units, and between gunners and cavalry units. The handling of artillery at the corps and army level was badly done. These deficiencies were noted by artillery officers such as Aleksey Yermolov and Ivan Kristianovich Sievers, while Russian gunners began to adopt French techniques. Throughout the Napoleonic Wars, Russian armies operated with unusually large numbers of artillery pieces. A Russian division would sometimes have as many guns as a French corps. There were either 12 or 14 artillery pieces in a battery during this period, the most of any major power.

In 1808, Russia began a comprehensive reform of its entire army. By November 1811, there were 27 artillery brigades, 8 reserve brigades, and 4 depot brigades. The Russian Imperial Guard had its own separate artillery establishment. Russia went to war in 1812 with 44 heavy, 58 light, and 22 horse batteries, not including the 80 artillery pieces of the Imperial Guard. Artillery manuals began to be published in 1808–1810, much of the instruction based on French practice. In 1811, the artillery reformer Sievers published a manual. By 1813–1814, there was great improvement in the handling of artillery at the corps and army echelons.

During the French campaign in 1814, the Russian artillery brigade attached to an infantry corps consisted of two light and one position batteries, with each battery armed with 12 guns. At the Battle of Craonne, the light and horse batteries were equipped with 6-pounders while the position batteries were equipped with 12-pounders. All batteries had 12 guns with the exception of two horse batteries with only 8 and 10 guns. (Note: Presumably, the 12-gun batteries used the 1800 configuration that included 4 licornes.) The Arakcheyev system made the Russian artillery possibly the most improved service among the major European powers during the Napoleonic Wars. Nevertheless, the Russian gunners were not as well-trained as French, British, and Austrian artillerists.

== Characteristics ==
The Russian 6-pounder cannon and 10-pounder licorne were hauled by a team of four horses. The 12-pounder cannon and the 20-pounder licorne were pulled by a team of eight horses. The ammunition cart for a cannon was hauled by two horses while the cart for a licorne required three horses. The 6-pounder cannon carried 20 rounds on the limber and required two ammunition carts. Each cart held 90 round shot and 30 canister shot. The 12-pounder cannon had 8 rounds on the limber and required three ammunition carts. Each licorne ammunition cart carried 80 shells, 30 canister shot, and 10 firebombs. (Note: The source stated that the 6-pounder and 12-pounder both had 90 shot and 30 canister on their carts. This is probably an error because for all other nationalities, the 6-pounder's ammunition vehicle carried more (and smaller) rounds than the 12-pounder's vehicle. That the 12-pounder needed three carts and the 6-pounder only two implies the 6-pounder's cart carried more rounds. It is not clear which cannon required 90 shot and 30 canister per cart (Pivka 1979, p. 39).) The 6-pounder was married to a carriage weighing 1,280 lb (581 kg) while the 12-pounder used a carriage weighing 2,160 lb (980 kg).

Caliber is typically measured as the inner diameter (or bore) of the gun barrel. However, in the 1800s, caliber was frequently measured by the weight of a round shot. Charge weight is the amount of gunpowder needed to propel the shot or shell. Note that the Russian pound was slightly heavier than the English pound. This meant that a Russian 6-pounder had a bore of 3.78 in (96 mm) while a British 6-pounder had a bore of 3.67 in (93 mm).

Characteristics: Arakcheyev system vs. Austrian and Prussian artillery pieces in 1815
Nation	Caliber	Type	Charge	Barrel
Russia	6-pounder	Cannon	2 lb (0.9 kg)	880 lb (399 kg)
Russia	12-pounder	Cannon	4 lb (1.8 kg)	2,080 lb (943 kg)
Russia	10-pounder	Licorne	2 lb (0.9 kg)	920 lb (417 kg)
Russia	20-pounder	Licorne	4 lb (1.8 kg)	1,680 lb (762 kg)
Austria	6-pounder	Cannon	1 1/2 lb (0.7 kg)	824 lb (374 kg)
Austria	12-pounder	Cannon	3 lb (1.4 kg)	1,618 lb (734 kg)
Austria	7-pounder	Howitzer	1 1/4 lb (0.6 kg)	563 lb (255 kg)
Austria	10-pounder	Howitzer	2 lb (0.9 kg)	824 lb (374 kg)
Prussia	6-pounder	Cannon	2 1/4 lb (1.0 kg)	935 lb (424 kg)
Prussia	12-pounder	Cannon	4 lb (1.8 kg)	1,847 lb (838 kg)
Prussia	7-pounder	Howitzer	2 lb (0.9 kg)	572 lb (259 kg)
Prussia	10-pounder	Howitzer	2 3/4 lb (1.2 kg)	1,370 lb (621 kg)

== Notes ==
Footnotes

Citations
