= Mavra (disambiguation) =

Mavra is a one-act opera buffa composed by Igor Stravinsky.

Mavra may also refer to:

- Mavra Shuvalova (1708–1759), Russian lady-in-waiting and a confidante of Empress Elizabeth of Russia
- Dominik Mavra (born 1994), Croatian professional basketball player
- Mavra (poetry), a collection of poems by the Urdu poet Noon Meem Rashid
- Mavra Chang, a major character in the science fiction Well World series by Jack L. Chalker
- Mavra, a recurring vampire character in The Dresden Files novel series, including Grave Peril
