= Secret howitzer =

18th-century Russian cannon

95 mm howitzer M1753
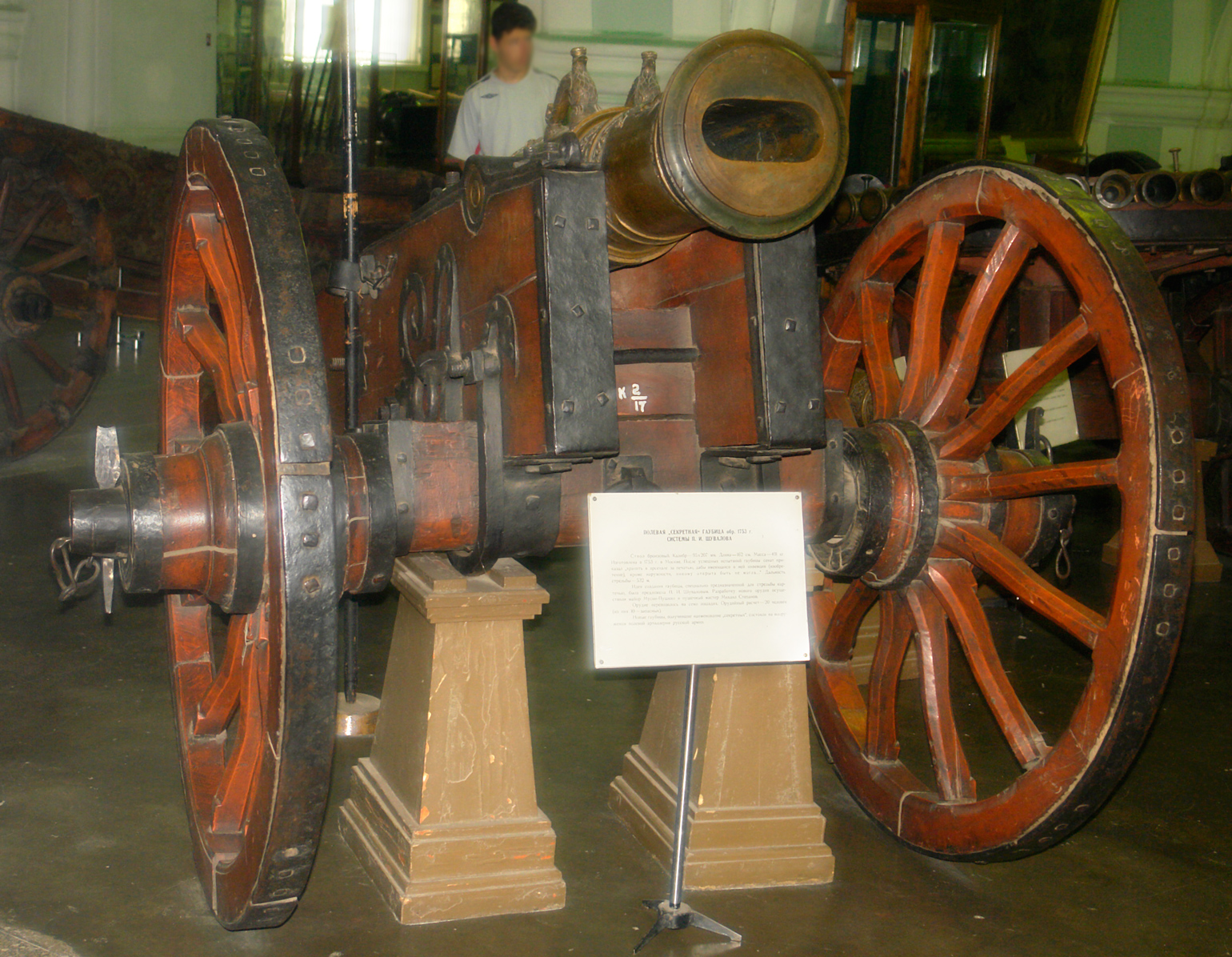
- Shuvalov's secret howitzer
- Type: howitzer
- Place of origin: Russian Empire

Service history
- Wars: Seven Years' War

Production history
- Designer: Peter Ivanovich Shuvalov
- Designed: 1753
- No. built: ca. 200

Specifications
- Mass: 491 kg (barrel)
- Caliber: 95×207 mm
- Barrels: 1620 mm
- Action: muzzle-loader
- Breech: conical
- Carriage: horse

The 95 mm howitzer M1753, called secret howitzer or Shuvalov's secret howitzer, was an 18th-century Russian cannon, a type of muzzle-loading howitzer, devised and introduced into service by artillery commander, General Peter Ivanovich Shuvalov.

Shuvalov's gun had an unusual, oval bore, which was designed to facilitate shot dispersal while firing canisters and therefore to increase the beaten zone. A special canister round produced for the cannon contained 168 balls; a grapeshot version, with 48 larger balls, was also provided for shooting at 300–600 yards distance.

The name of the gun comes from the great secrecy which surrounded it. While not in use, the muzzle was covered with a lid to hide its unusual shape. The death penalty was set as the punishment for revealing the secret of the weapon.

== History ==
The first guns built used quoins for changing the elevation, but in 1753–1758 turnscrews were introduced. Originally they had cylindrical powder chambers like howitzers, but guns produced after 1758 had conical chambers like licornes. The guns proved quite effective in action during Seven Years' War, especially at Gross-Jägersdorf, but some were lost to Prussians at Zorndorf (thus revealing their secret).

Originally used by the Observation Corps and howitzer units, in 1759 they were attached to the infantry regiments; however, next year the decision was reversed. Secret howitzers were withdrawn from service soon after the death of their inventor, in the 1780s.

== Usage ==
In practice the shot dispersal was hardly better than of ordinary guns, reloading was slower, and the inability of the cannon to fire any other projectiles hampered its effectiveness. Slow reloading was the reason given for the loss of 17 of these guns at Zorndorf, where they were overrun by cavalry before they could fire a second shot. There were some shot and shells produced for it, looking like rugby balls, but they found no practical use. Adding yet another type of ammunition created an additional burden for logistics.

== See also ==
- Licorne
