= Licorne =

18th/19th-century Russian howitzer

Licorne (Russian: единорог, yedinorog, 'unicorn') is the French name of an 18th- and 19th-century Russian cannon, a type of muzzle-loading howitzer, devised in 1757 by M.W. Danilov and S.A. Martynov and accepted by artillery commander, general Peter Ivanovich Shuvalov.

The licorne was a hybrid between the howitzers and guns of the era (a gun-howitzer), with a longer barrel than contemporary howitzers, giving projectiles a flatter trajectory, but longer range. Similar to the howitzers, they had a powder chamber of smaller diameter than the gun caliber, but whereas a howitzer's chamber was cylindrical, a licorne's was conical, with its base diameter the same as the gun bore. The conical chamber was easier to load and facilitated the placement of the projectile perfectly in the center of the barrel. Licornes were able to fire both the solid shot used for cannons and howitzer shells, as well as grapeshot and canister.

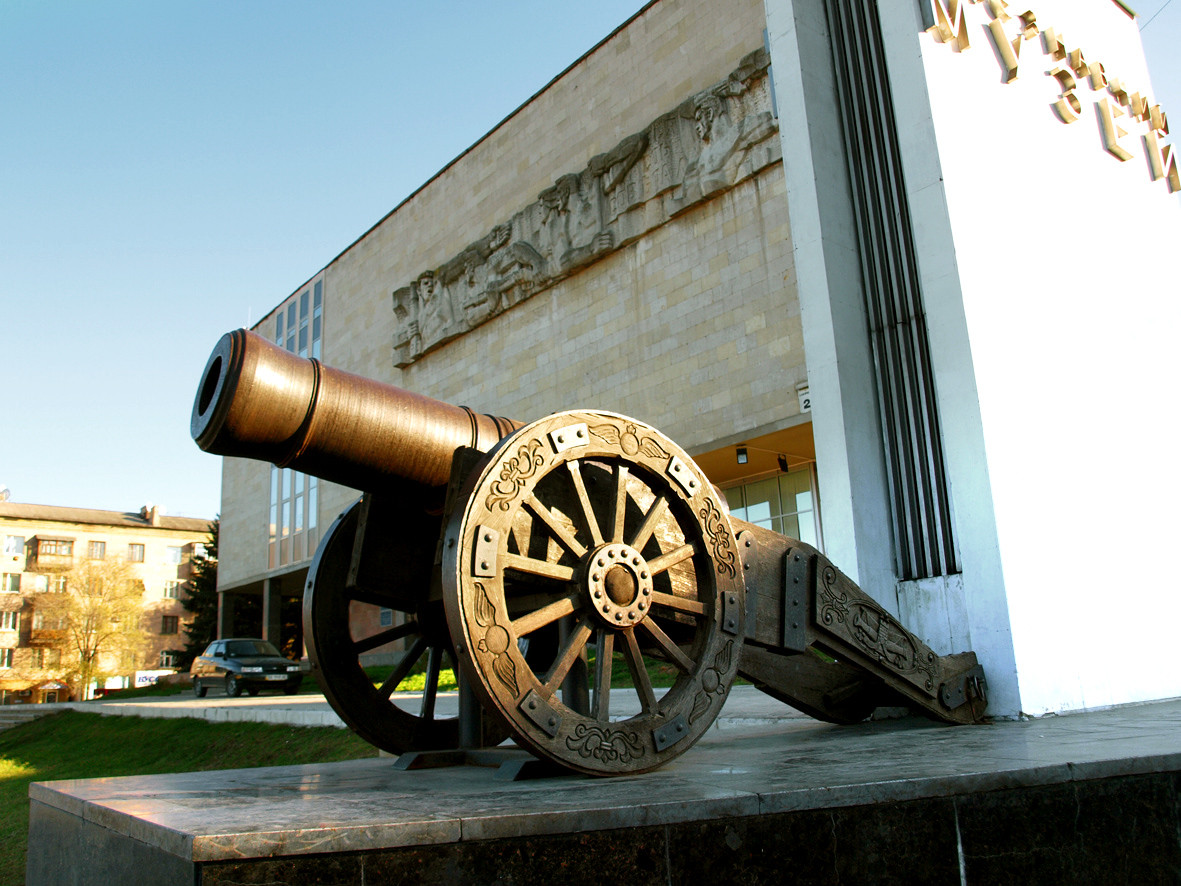
Licorne of 1814 (Luhansk)

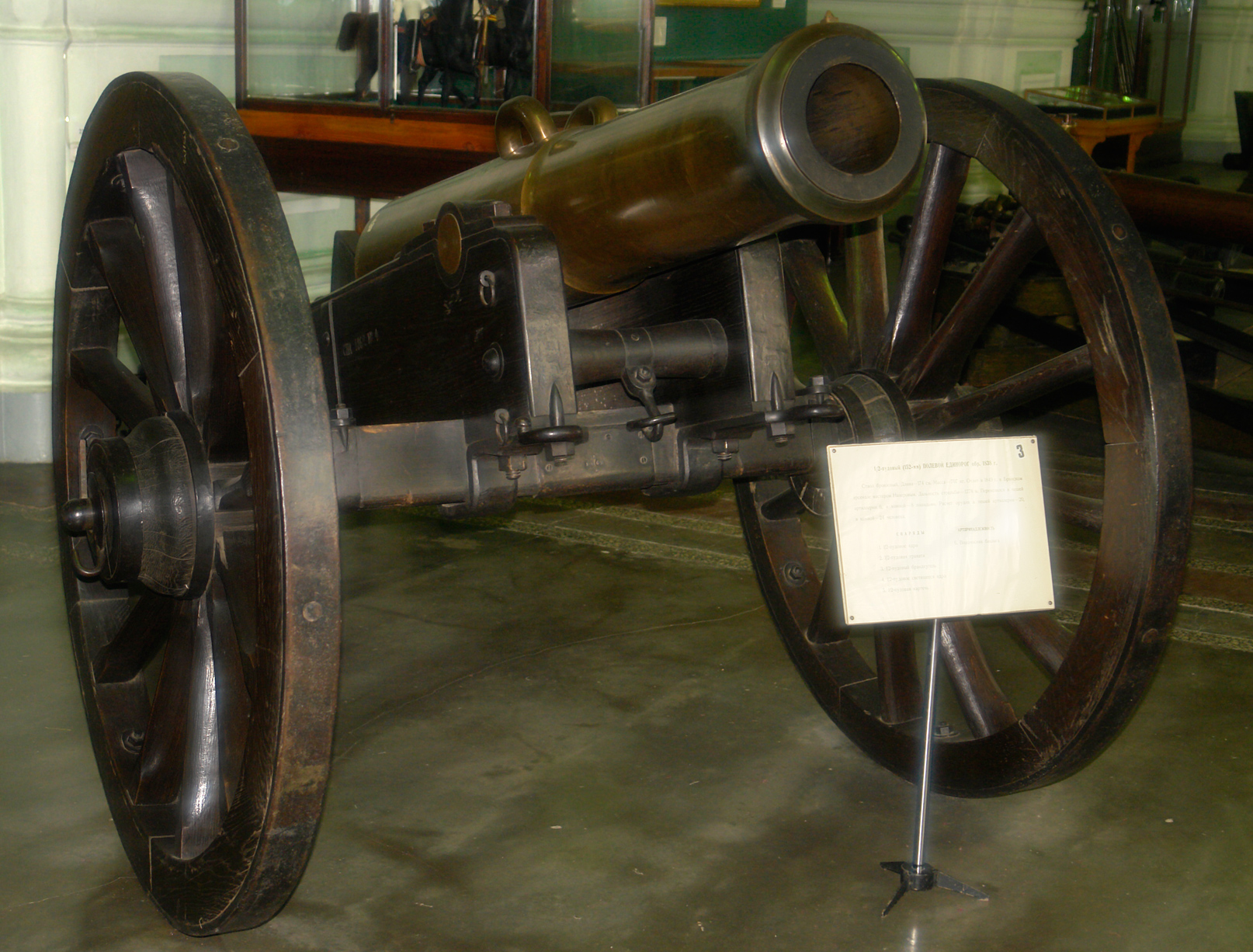
6 in licorne of 1838

The length of the barrel was 9 or 10 calibres, and the weight of the propellant charge to that of the missile was set at 1:5, the mean between the heaviest charge for a cannon (half the weight of the shot) and the lightest charge for a mortar (one tenth of the weight of the bomb). As introduced into Russian service in 1758 with the Shuvalov artillery system, licornes were of 8-pounder type, then 10-, 20-, 40-, and 80-pounders were produced; the Russian measurement system at the time however was in poods, thus the licornes in this list were actually quarter-pood, half-pood, 1-pood, and 2-pood. The 8-pounder required two horses to move it, while the heavier licornes required three, five, six, and twelve horses respectively. Shuvalov's Secret Howitzer Corps was equipped with 38 licornes out of the roughly 200 cannon it had in 1758; the Corps was renamed with this occasion as the Bombardier Corps. A further 105 licornes were introduced the next year as replacement for medium artillery in other army units, including the cavalry. In the same year two half-pood licornes (and four secret howitzers) were loaned for a demonstration to the Austrians, but they found the range too short, and the carriages too heavy. Official tests were arranged in Russia in 1760, but these failed to show an appreciable advantage of the licorne over older designs. Nevertheless, the Senate was successfully pressured by Shuvalov to declare the licorne an improvement, albeit not a satisfactory one. The number of licornes in service rose to 280 in that year, compared with 603 cannons, 169 howitzers, and 117 mortars; most of them (224) were in the field artillery. Major-General Aleksandr Glebov, who assumed command of the artillery of the field army in 1760, soon issued instructions to use the new guns to support attacks with indirect fire, shooting over their own attacking troops, aiming to disrupt the deployment of enemy reserves.

The 2-pood licorne was abandoned as impractically heavy in 1762, right after Shuvalov's death. After 1805, the Russian army used 2-, 10- and 18-pounder licornes. A light foot artillery company consisted of four 10-pounder licornes, four light and four medium 6-pounder guns; a heavy artillery company had four light and four heavy 12-pounder guns and four 18- and two 2-pounder licornes. Six light 6-pounder guns and six 10-pounder licornes made a company of horse artillery. Licornes were usually deployed on the flanks of the batteries. This arrangement is now usually called the "System of 1805" or the Arakcheyev artillery system, and was largely devised by Aleksey Arakcheyev, after the lessons learned at the Battle of Austerlitz, where Russian artillery had performed poorly. (In the System of 1805, the 2-pounder licorne is sometimes referred to as a 3-pounder, and the 18-pounder as a 20-pounder). The 2-pounder was no longer in service by the war of 1812, but the other two models soldiered on until the Crimean War, when many were captured by the British as prizes. They had greater accuracy than the competing 6 inch French howitzer.

Licornes were also used by Karađorđe's and Congress Poland's artillery units.

The name comes from unicorn-shaped handles on the barrel of the guns; a unicorn is figured on the Shuvalov family's coat of arms.

== See also ==
- Secret howitzer, another introduction of Shuvalov
- Canon obusier de 12, "Napoleon"
