= Mavra Shuvalova =

Russian socialite and noble

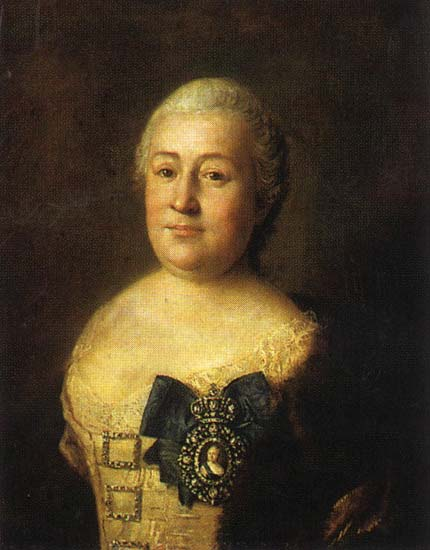
Mavra Shuvalov

Mavra Yegorovna Shuvalov, née Shepeleva, (April 23 (4 May) 1708 – 9 (20) June 1759), was a Russian lady-in-waiting, socialite and noble and a confidante of Empress Elizabeth of Russia. She was in 1742 married to Count Peter Ivanovich Shuvalov. She played an influential role in Russia during the reign of Elizabeth.

== Biography ==
She was born in a noble boyar family and was in 1719 appointed maid of honor to Princess Anna Petrovna. With a cheerful disposition and boldness, she became a favorite at court and a friend of princess Elizabeth. She followed Anna to Holstein in 1727, but corresponded with Elizabeth.

Upon the accession of Elizabeth (1741), she was arranged to marry Shuvalov (1742), which was a beneficial match and thought to have been arranged by her influence on Elizabeth. The marriage was not particularly happy: the reports of foreign diplomats from Russia reported stories about the countless' betrayals of Shuvalov. However, with regard to obtaining and preserving power, privilege, wealth, the spouses understood each other and acted together, as a united and energetic team.

Elizabeth, although there were times and cooling, retained affection for her friend for life. In particular, she loved and appreciated her clear and sarcastic wit, cheerful character, because she always had in reserve a funny joke.

Contemporaries preserved, however, memory of another Shuvalova: being invariably cheerful, witty and searchingly with the powerful, Shuvalova was arrogant and rude to those who lacked power. She willingly helped a protégé, but at the same time, she pursued revenge on people who displeased her. She was known to gather peoples secret, and even Kirill Razumovsky was sometimes forced to crouch in front of her. She was described as a devoted and loving spouse and parent, loved good food and drink and gambling. Despite never having a formal position in cabinet, she exerted a large influence upon policy.
