= Aleksey Arakcheyev =

Russian general and statesman (1769–1834)

General Aleksey Arakcheyev
- Алексей Андреевич Аракчеев
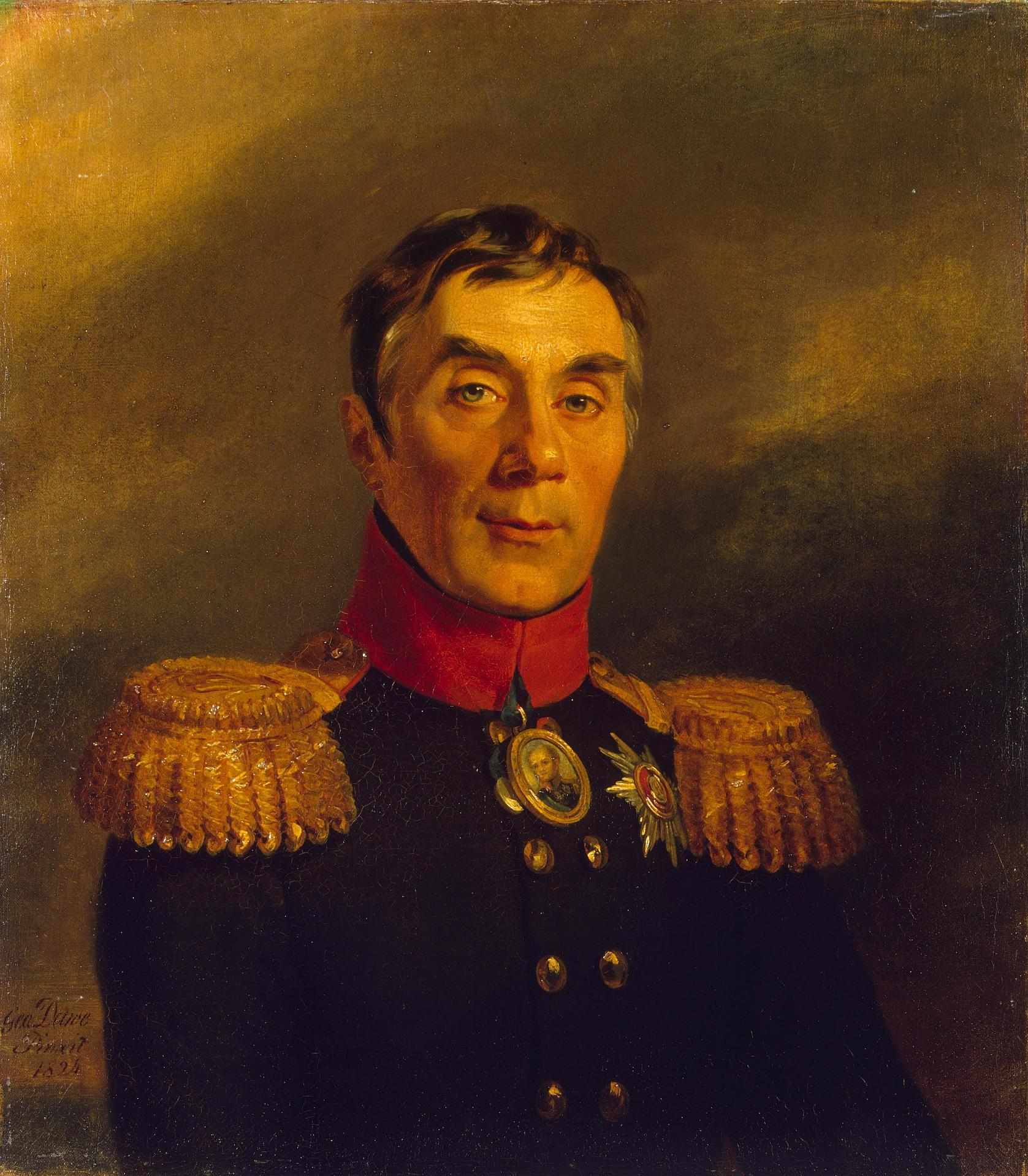
- Portrait by George Dawe, Military Gallery of the Winter Palace (1824)
- Born: 4 October [O.S. 23 September] 1769; Garusovo, Vyshnevolotsky Uyezd, Russian Empire
- Died: 3 May [O.S. 21 April] 1834 (aged 64); Gruzino, Russian Empire
- Military career
- Allegiance: Russia
- Branch: Imperial Russian Army
- Service years: 1783–1825
- Rank: General
- Conflicts: Napoleonic Wars; Finnish War; French invasion of Russia; Chuguev Uprising

Minister of War of Russia
- In office 1808–1810
- Monarch: Alexander
- Preceded by: Sergey Vyazmitinov
- Succeeded by: Mikhail Barclay de Tolly

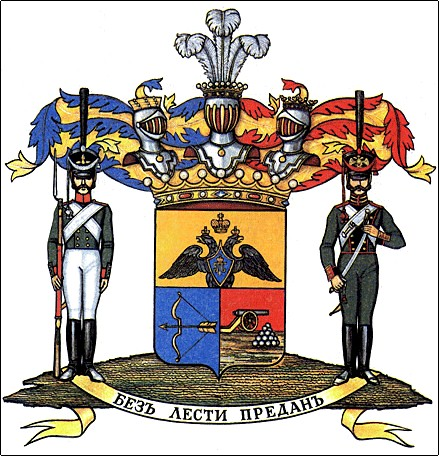
Coat of arms of the counts of Arakcheyev. Motto: By work and diligence

Count Aleksey Andreyevich Arakcheyev (Note: The first name, patronymic, and last name are also written as Aleksei, Alexey or Alexei Andreevich Arakcheev (see Romanization of Russian and Alexey).) (Russian: Алексе́й Андре́евич Аракче́ев; 4 October [O.S. 23 September] 1769 – 3 May [O.S. 21 April] 1834) was a Russian general and statesman during the reign of Tsar Alexander I.

He served under Paul I and Alexander I as an army commander and Inspector of Artillery. He had a violent temper, but was a competent artillerist, and is known for his reforms of Russian artillery known as the System of 1805 or Arakcheyev artillery system. When Alexander was succeeded by Nicholas I, he lost all his offices.

== Early years ==
Count Arakcheyev was born on his father's estate in Garusovo, in Vyshnevolotsky Uyezd (at the time a part of Novgorod Governorate, from 1796 part of Tver Governorate). He was educated in arithmetic by a priest, and though he shone at arithmetic, he never mastered writing and grammar. In 1783, with the help of General Peter Ivanovich Melissino, Arakcheyev enrolled in the Shlyakhetny artillery school in Saint-Petersburg. By 1787 he had become a lieutenant instructor, and gave artillery and fortification lessons to Prince Nicholas Saltykov's sons. In 1791 he became the school's assistant director.

In 1792 Saltykov recommended Arakcheyev to Tsesarevich Paul, son of Tsarina Catherine the Great and heir to the throne, who was searching for a capable artillery officer. Arakcheyev became chief artillery officer to the military commandant of Paul's residence, Gatchina Palace.

== Paul I's reign ==
Arakcheyev became noted for his ruthless manners and zealousness, and by 1794 he was artillery inspector at Gatchina. Two years later, he became infantry inspector of the army, promoted by Catherine.

Catherine died in 1796, and Arakcheyev was at Tsar Paul's side during his accession. On November 7, 1796, Arakcheyev was promoted from colonel to major-general and appointed as commandant of the garrison of Saint Petersburg. In April 1797, he was promoted to quartermaster-general, and received the title of baron from the Tsar. A year later, after an officer, Colonel Lehn, committed suicide, he was temporarily retired with the rank of lieutenant-general. In 1799 he was reinstated as Inspector-general of Artillery position and quartermaster-general and given the title of count. He was disgraced and retired in 1800 after hiding misdeeds by his subordinates. His name had become synonymous with despotism, known in Russian as Arakcheyevshchina ('Arakcheyevism').

== Alexander I's reign ==
In May 1803, the new Tsar Alexander I restored his position as Inspector of Artillery. During the first years he reorganized the artillery units, improved officer training, and issued new regulations.

After the lessons learned at the Battle of Austerlitz, where Russian artillery had performed poorly, Arakcheyev devised the Arakcheyev artillery system or System of 1805. Under this arrangement, 6- and 12-pounder guns were employed throughout the army, as well as 2-, 10-, and 18-pounder licornes. Under the new system, a single Russian division had as much artillery as an entire French corps. A foot artillery battalion was composed of two light and two heavy companies. A light foot artillery company consisted of four 10-pounder licornes, four light and four medium 6-pounder guns. A heavy artillery company had four light and four heavy 12-pounder guns and four 18- and two 2-pounder licornes. Six light 6-pounder guns and six 10-pounder licornes made a company of horse artillery. Licornes were usually deployed on the flanks of the batteries. All these guns used a screw elevating mechanism instead of the old system of wedges and had an improved sighting apparatus.

Promoted in January 1808 to Minister of War and inspector-general of all infantry and artillery, he once more reorganized the army and the grading of the army staff. In 1808 he created a publication called the "artillery periodical". During the Finnish War of 1808–9, Alexander ordered the army to invade Sweden across the frozen Gulf of Bothnia; only Arakcheyev was willing to undertake this task. By 1810, Arakcheyev had resigned as War Minister and was sitting on the board of the Council of State as chairman in military science.

During the Patriotic War of 1812, he oversaw recruitment and management of army supplies. He introduced several useful military reforms, which proved themselves during the wars of 1812–1814. Throughout his service, Arakcheyev was known for his meticulous following of the will of the tsar.

I am the friend of the tsar and complaints about me can be made only to God.

Starting in 1816, he organized military-agricultural colonies, an idea initially conceived by Alexander I. At first Arakcheyev tried to oppose them, but when he agreed, he did so with unrelenting rigor. The hardships of military service combined with the hardships of peasant life created terrifying conditions in those settlements.

The ruthlessness he exhibited in the military extended to his home. The women peasants in Arakcheyev's own Gruzino estate near Novgorod were required to produce one child each year. Arakcheyev even ordered the hanging of all cats, on account of his fondness for nightingales.

From 1815 to Tsar Alexander's death, Arakcheyev was near the tsar as member of the State Council, and was an influential voice in the tsar's entourage. During Alexander I's journeys abroad, Arakcheev would follow, giving his accord to every law passed. By 1823, he was 'at the height of his power' and was able to plot the downfall of his rival, Education Minister Prince Alexander Golitsyn, by enlisting the support of a firebrand priest, Archimandrite Photius, who accused Golitsyn of apostasy. He also forced the resignation of Pyotr Mikhailovich Volkonsky

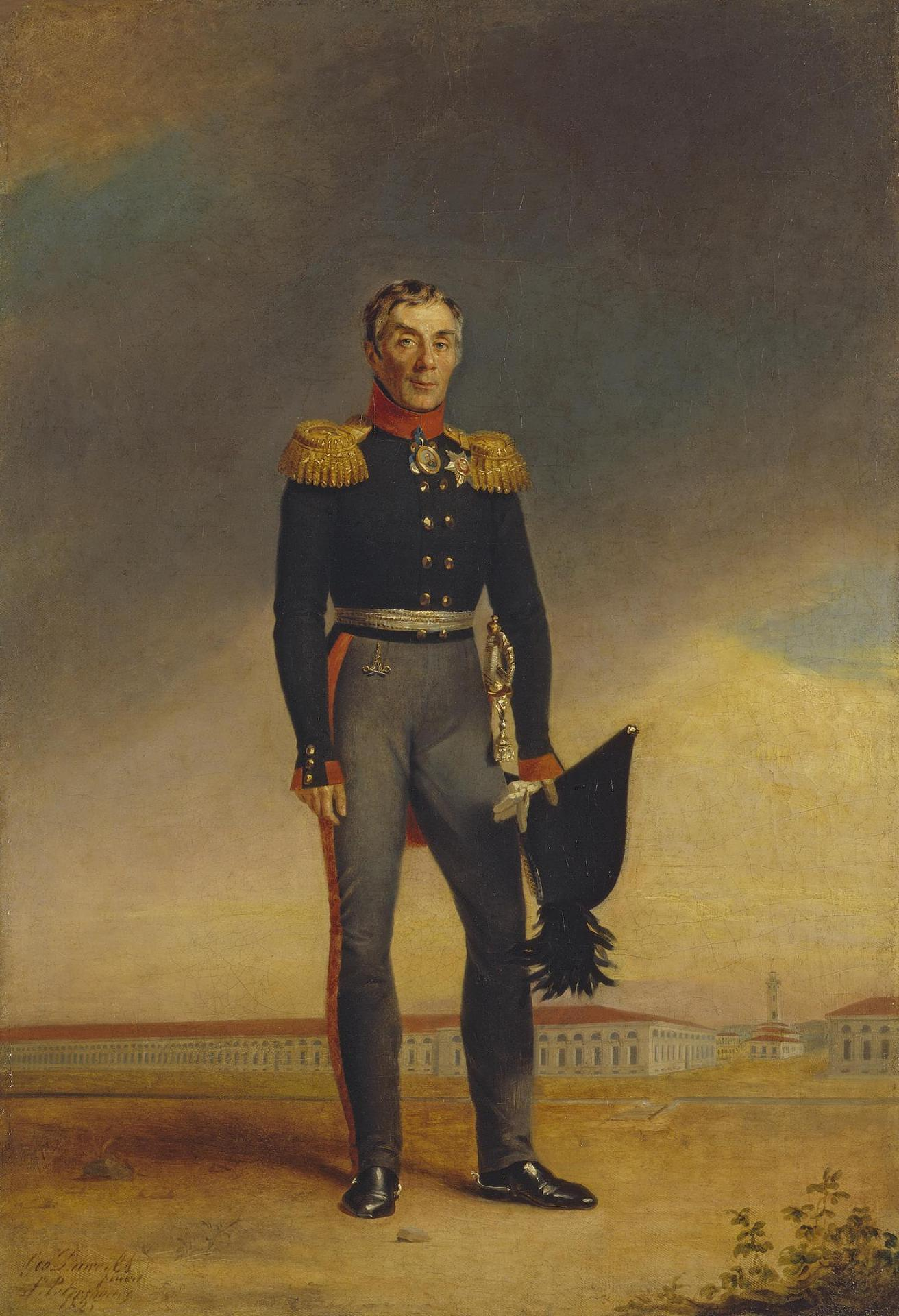
Another portrait by George Dawe, Hermitage Museum

== Later years ==
After Alexander I was succeeded by Nicholas I, Arakcheyev was dismissed from all positions in the government, including his seat in the State Council and Inspector of Artillery and Infantry. He was removed from the court and exiled to his estate, Gruzino, near Novgorod. There he lived until his death in 1834, when he was interred in a local church. Furthermore, after Arakcheyev's death, the tsar requisitioned his land and property due to the inability to find legal heirs.

== Personal life ==
Arakcheyev purchased the Gruzino estate near Novgorod in 1788. He was in his thirties when he married 18-year-old Anastasia Vasilievna Khomutova. She liked parties and dances; he did not, was intensely jealous of her, and gave the servants a list of addresses forbidden to her. In the second year of the marriage, she left him and they never met again.

Arakcheyev also had a long-term mistress, Nastasia Fedorovna Minkina. During his absence from their estate, she bore a son who had red hair and blue eyes, and resembled neither her nor Arakcheyev. The boy was named Mikhail Shumsky, and grew to be a troublesome drunkard. Minkina was so tyrannical that she was murdered by resentful servants. Arakcheyev was grief-stricken and unable to function at court for some time.

There was also an 'unofficial peasant wife' who bore him two illegitimate sons, sent to be educated in the Corps des Pages.

== Temper and "Arakcheevshchina" ==
Arakcheyev is said to have executed two junior officers by having them buried up to their necks and leaving them to die of starvation and thirst. On another occasion he is said to have personally cut off another officer's head with his sword after a perceived infraction. "Arakcheevshchina" (Russian: аракчеевщина), roughly translated as "the Arakcheev régime", became a derogatory term for a military state, denoting "the atmosphere of reactionary repression closing over Russian society". Soviet writers routinely applied this term to characterize a regime of reactionary oppression. For instance, in 1950, Joseph Stalin described the situation fostered by Ivan Meshchaninov in the Soviet Institute of Language and Thought as "Arakcheevshchina".

== In popular culture ==
Arakcheyev features in Leo Tolstoy's novel War and Peace, when in 1809 Prince Andrei has an audience with him. Tolstoy portrays him as rude, abrupt, ungrammatical, with 'scowling brows, dull eyes, and an overhanging red nose'. He is also discussed prominently in the book's epilogue, where he is negatively associated with the Russian government's perceived problems.

== Notes ==
Preceded by Sergey Vyazmitinov	Minister of Land Forces; 1808 – 1810	Succeeded by Michael Barclay de Tolly
