= Peter Ivanovich Shuvalov =

Russian statesman and field marshal

- Пётр Иванович Шувалов
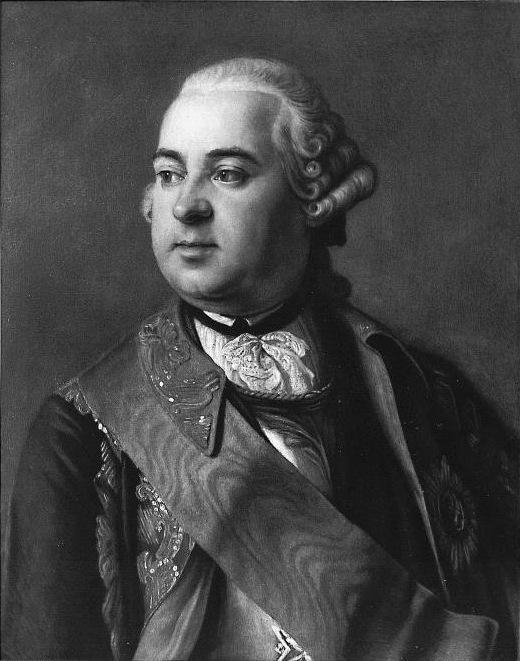
- Born: 1711
- Died: 15 January [O.S. 4 January] 1762; Saint Petersburg
- Occupations: Politician; Military figure

Count Peter (Note: also Pyotr) Ivanovich Shuvalov (Russian: Пётр Иванович Шувалов, romanized: Pëtr Ivanovič Šuvalov; 1711 – 15 January [O.S. 4 January] 1762) was a Russian statesman and Field Marshal who, together with his brother Aleksandr Shuvalov, paved the way for the elevation of the Shuvalov family to the highest offices of the Russian Empire. He is also remembered as the founder of Izhevsk, the capital of Udmurtia.

== Early career ==
Pyotr Shuvalov began his career as a page at the court of tsesarevna Elizabeth. He was brought to tsesarevna's attention when he married her close friend and in-law, Mavra Shepeleva. For his assistance in the enthronement of Elizabeth, he was promoted to the rank of Chamberlain, then appointed senator and became a count in 1746.

== Government career ==
Initially, Shuvalov was in charge of an army division stationed near St.Petersburg and then the Observation Corps, formed by Shuvalov himself and designated to protect the rear of the regular army. He also held the post of a conference minister and managed the artillery and weapons chancelleries.

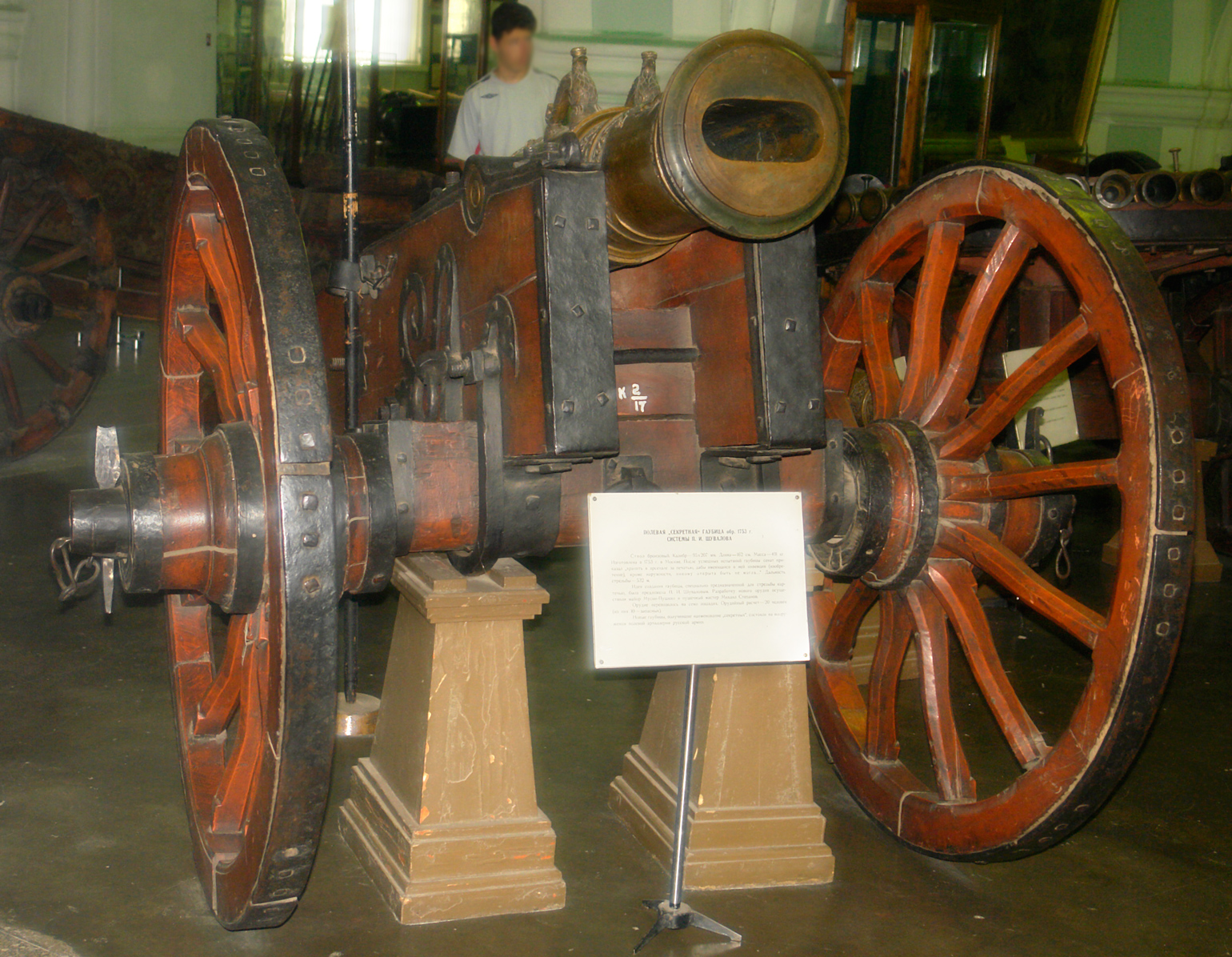
The "secret howitzer" invented by Shuvalov; shape of the bore was to disperse shot

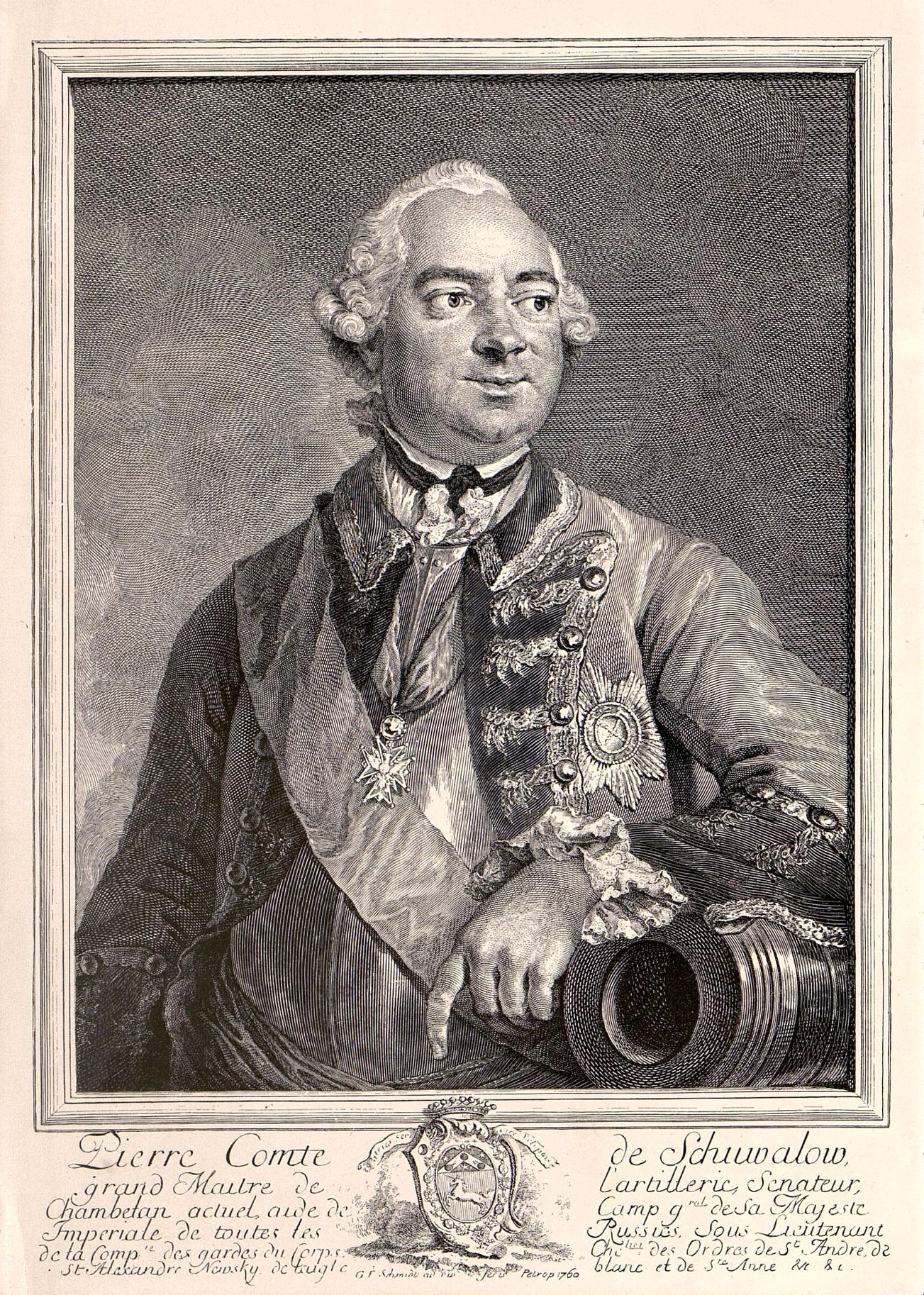
Shuvalov with a cannon

Shuvalov was appointed Master General of the Ordnance in 1756 and implemented the Shuvalov artillery system. He also had a few weapons factories built. He invented a special canister-shooting gun with an oval bore, called "secret howitzer", which had a limited success; his more useful addition to Russian artillery were licornes, a kind of gun-howitzers, which remained in service for almost hundred years. He enjoyed unlimited power throughout the reign of Elizabeth due to his wife's and cousin Ivan Ivanovich Shuvalov's influence on the empress. Almost no single affair of the state was to be taken care of without Shuvalov, especially those pertaining to national economy and military organization. In 1753, Shuvalov presented before the Governing Senate a project for eliminating internal customs offices and outposts and increasing tariffs on imported goods, instead.

== Personal life ==
Shuvalov is known to have been very selfish at times. He worried excessively about his own interests and, quite often, to the detriment of the state and private parties. For example, Shuvalov obtained for himself an exclusive right to export lumber, lard, blubber oil and monopolized the seal trade. Having led a luxurious lifestyle, Shuvalov left a debt of more than a million rubles to the state treasury.
