= Christian Nicolaus von Linger =

Prussian general (1669–1755)

Christian Nicholaus von Linger
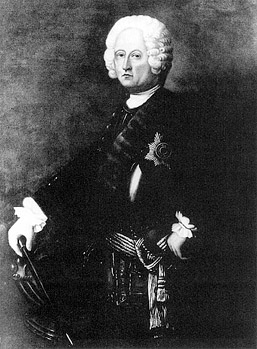
- Born: 5 April 1669; Berlin
- Died: 17 April 1755 (aged 86); Berlin
- Military career
- Allegiance: (Kingdom of Prussia) Prussia
- Branch: Artillery
- Service years: 1688–1755
- Rank: General of the Artillery
- Conflicts: Nine Years' War Bonn Namur; War of the Spanish Succession; Great Northern War Stralsund; First Silesian War; Second Silesian War Siege of Prague
- Awards: Order of the Black Eagle; Equestrian statue of Frederick the Great

Christian Nicolaus von Linger (5 April 1669 in Berlin, died 17 April 1755) was a Prussian general. He was chief of the Prussian artillery from 1716. In his 67-year military career, he served three monarchs in six wars, and founded the Prussian artillery arm of the military. He was appointed the first General of the Artillery by King Frederick II in 1744.

== Family ==
Christian Nicolaus von Linger was the son of Solomon Linger, a Brandenburg master armourer, who died in 1683, and his wife Marie, (née Wiese). He was born on 5 April 1669 in Berlin and died on 17 April 1755, also in Berlin.

== Military service ==
In 1688, as a 19-year-old, he entered the Prussian Artillery as a Bombardier. During the campaign against France 1689–1697, he served in the sieges at Bonn and Namur, and was promoted to lieutenant in 1696. In October 1701, he was promoted to captain and company chief, the highest position available to non-royal, non-aristocratic young men. A year later, in the War of the Spanish Succession, he examined and experimented with different artillery positions. For his service, Frederick I raised him to the Prussian nobility, awarded him the rank of major, and, in 1709, lieutenant colonel.

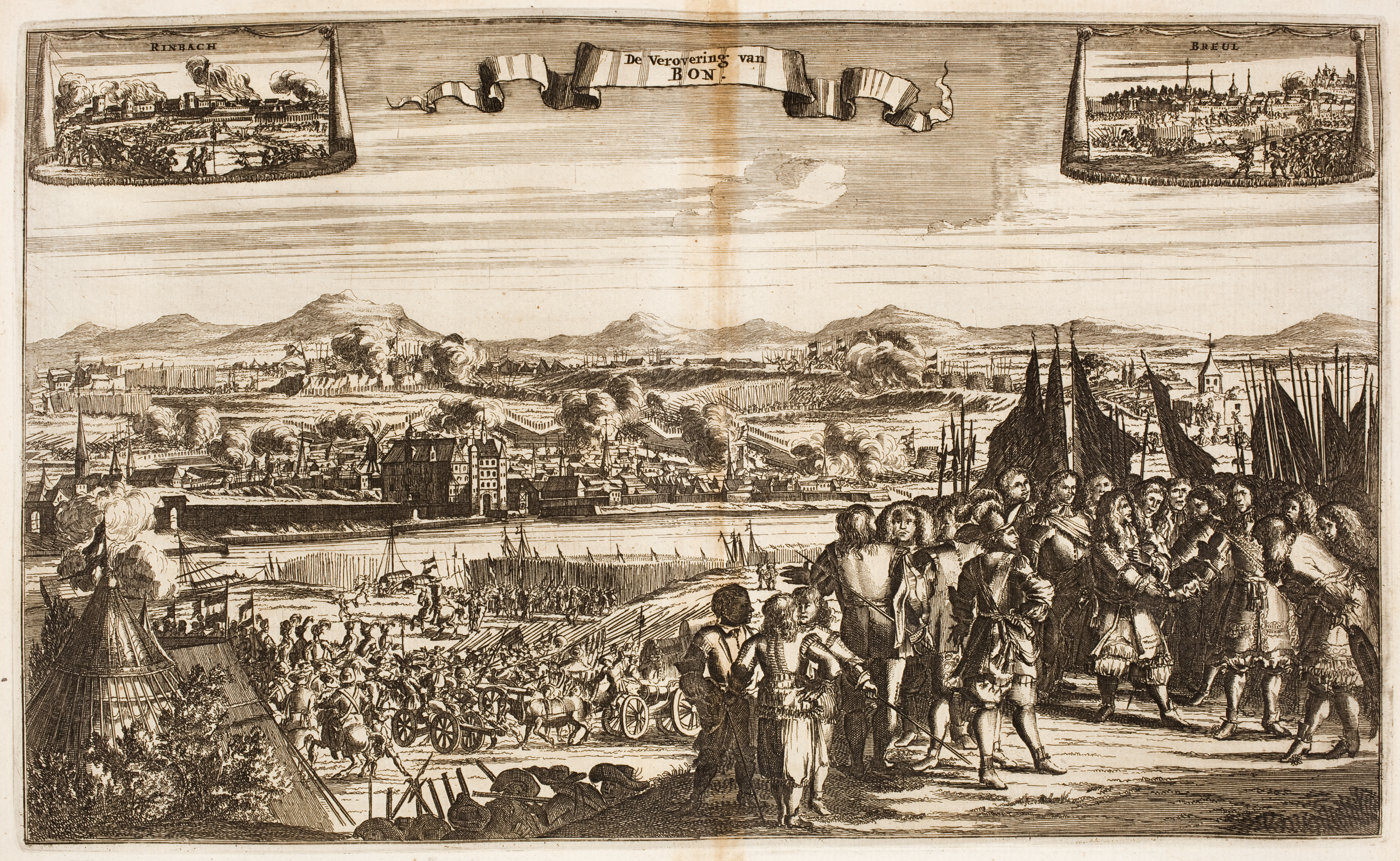
Linger participated in the Siege of Bonn during the War of the Grand Alliance in 1689.

After his return from campaigning in the May 1713, Linger was released from active service. After the ascension of the so-called Soldier King, on 2 January 1714, Linger was reactivated in service and, a year later, served against Sweden in the Great Northern War. He participated in the occupation of Pomerania. After his activities in the sieges of Stralsund, and Stetten, he was promoted in 1716 to colonel and proprietor of the Prussian Artillery corps. With this new position, he centralized the royal Prussian artillery. He refortified the Berlin armory; he also refitted the factory in which armaments were made. Under his leadership, the factory produced large amounts of armaments and cannons for the First Silesian War. Linger standardized the caliber of the cannons, so that they had reliably configured 3, 6, 12, and 14 gauge barrels, making it easier to manufacture standardized cannonballs that would fit the proper-sized cannons. In 1724, he was appointed as a regional captain and councilman of Rosenberg, and in 1728, raised to the rank of major general. His loyalty to the Prussian king was rewarded when Frederick William made him a member of the military cabinet in 1730; after the Crown Prince's abortive attempt to flee to England, Linger was required to participate in the court-martial of Hans Hermann von Katte. Shortly before Frederick William's death, he promoted Linger lieutenant general in 1739.

Under his successor, Frederick II, Linger organized the Siege of Brieg in the First Silesian War. After the occupation of Silesia the fortress at Glogau was expanded under his supervision. His strength lay in the establishment and construction of new Silesian artillery companies. In 1743, Linger was promoted to General of the Artillery, the first to hold that rank. A year later, Frederick the Great honored his worthy general with the award of the Black Eagle Order. During the Second Silesian War, Linger, already 75 years old, was at the head of the field artillery regiment at the 1744 Siege of Prague. He organized and directed the bombardment of the city, resulting in Prague's surrender on 16 September 1744. It was his last military action.

The King rewarded Lingen with properties at Alt-Künckendorf and Groß-Zieten near Angermünde; Christian Nicolaus von Linger died on 17 April 1755, at age 86 years, in Berlin. In his long soldier's life of 67 years he served three Prussian monarchs. Linger was buried in the Berlin garrison church. Historian Christopher Duffy noted that Linger spent his final years in a senile state.

== Marriages and descendants ==
Lingen was married twice.

- 1698 marriage with Katharina Elisabeth Gräfen (died 1711)

- This marriage produced five children, four daughters and a son:

- Johanna Henriette (1699–1780) married Bernhard von Beauvryé (major general)
- Charlotte married the Danish officer David Levin von Katte (1690–1758).
- Dorothea Philippina (* 1703; † 24. Juni 1756) married the colonel of artillery Valentin Bodo von der Osten (1669–1757).
- Friedrich Albrecht Gustav Ludwig von Linger (1757–1791); he married Katharine Dorothea Antoinette Küchmeister von Sternberg

- Friedrich Albrecht Gustav Ludwig von Linger (1757–1791).

- 1716 marriage with Susanna Maria Kunsch von Breitenwald († 1745)

- Wilhelm von Linger (1720–1756) died childless; he was a major in a Prussian cuirassier regiment.

== Monuments ==
Linger's name, listed as C. V. LINGER GEN. D. ART., appears on the Equestrian statue of Frederick the Great in Berlin, Unter den Linden. The monument was erected in 1851 by Frederick the Great's great-great nephew, Frederick William IV.

On the occasion of the Königsberg maneuvers in 1910, Emperor Wilhelm II gave to the foot artillery regiment 'von Linger' (Ostpr.) No. 1 a bronze bust of the general, created according to a model by the Berlin sculptor Christian Daniel Rauch. The bust displayed in the traditional section of the artillery collegiate building next to the Haberberg Church. It was lost in 1945. Before 1914, retiring officers of the regiment received a reduced bronze copy of the bust as a farewell present. One of these replicas is preserved in the Artillery School of the German Armed Forces in Idar-Oberstein.
