= Vale =

A vale is a type of valley.

Vale may also refer to:

== Places ==
=== Georgia ===
- Vale, Georgia, a town in the Samtskhe-Javakheti region

=== Norway ===
- Våle Municipality, a former municipality in Vestfold county

=== Portugal ===
- Vale (Santa Maria da Feira), a former civil parish in the municipality of Santa Maria da Feira

=== Romania ===
- Vale, a village in Aluniş Commune, Cluj County
- Vale, a village in Toplița city, Harghita County
- Vale (Hungarian: Vále), a village in Săliște town, Sibiu County

=== United Kingdom ===
- Vale, Guernsey, a parish in Guernsey
- Vale of Belvoir, a rural area in England, known locally as "The Vale"
- Vale of Glamorgan, a county borough in South Wales, commonly referred to as "The Vale"
- Vale of Leven, an area of West Dunbartonshire, Scotland, also known as "The Vale"

=== United States ===
- Vale, Avery County, North Carolina
- Vail, Colorado
- Vale, Lincoln County, North Carolina
- Vale, Oregon
- Vale, South Dakota
- Vale, West Virginia
- Vale Summit, Maryland
- Vale Township, Butte County, South Dakota
- Vale Tunnel, Raytown, Missouri
- Lyman Estate, known as "The Vale", Waltham, Massachusetts

== Languages ==
- Vale language, a minor Sudanic language
- Vale languages or "Ruto-Vale", a group of languages
- Central Vale language, a minor Central Sudanic language
- vale ('farewell') in Latin, as in ave atque vale. Particularly used in Australia and its obituaries as an imperative verb (cf. RIP).
- Vale, programming language

== People ==
- Vale (surname), including a list of people with the name
- Vale P. Thielman, American politician
- Short form of the Italian given name Valentina or Valeria

== Sports teams ==
- Port Vale F.C.
- Abbey Vale F.C.
- Raynes Park Vale F.C.
- Vale of Leven F.C.

=== Nicknames ===
- Deveronvale F.C.
- Stoneywood Parkvale F.C.

== Transportation ==
- HNoMS Vale, warships of the Royal Norwegian Navy
- SS Vale, a German cargo ship
- Vale Special, a British sports car

== Other uses ==
- Vale TV, a Venezuelan television channel
- Vale (album), a January Black Veil Brides album
- Vale, a 2008 Orden Ogan album
- Vale (company), a Brazilian mining company
- Vale gas field, a North Sea gas field
- The home town for the protagonists in the Nintendo game series Golden Sun
- Vale, the primary setting of the RoosterTeeth animated series RWBY
- An alternate spelling of Váli, a Norse god
- The Vale, a 2025 novel by Abigail Hing Wen
- The Vale: Shadow of the Crown, a 2021 action role-playing audio game

== See also ==
- Val (disambiguation)
- Vail (disambiguation)
- Vallier
- Vallières (disambiguation)
- Veil (disambiguation)
