= Veil (disambiguation) =

A veil is an article of clothing.

Veil(s) may also refer to:

== Biology ==
- Veil (mycology), two structures associated with the fruiting bodies of some fungi
- Caul, a membrane sometimes found on the face of a newborn child
- A yeast film similar to flor, developing at the surface of wine in a barrel

== People with the surname ==
- Antoine Veil (1926–2013), French civil servant
- Bucky Veil (1881–1931), American baseball pitcher
- Hans-Jürgen Veil (born 1946), German wrestler
- Sibyle Veil (born 1977), French telecommunications and media executive
- Simone Veil (1927–2017), French lawyer and politician
- Suzanne Veil (1886–1956), French chemist.
- Theodor Veil (1879–1965), German architect; see Deutscher Werkbund § Members
- Thomas de Veil (1684–1746), English magistrate

== Arts and entertainment ==
- Veil (album), a 1993 album by Band of Susans
- Veil (comics), a mutant in the Marvel Comics universe
- Veil (TV series), a 2023 Singaporean mystery series
- The Veils, an English/New Zealand rock band
- Veil, a realm in the 2009 video game Wolfenstein
- Veil: The Secret Wars of the CIA, a 1987 book by Bob Woodward

== Other uses ==
- Video Encoded Invisible Light, a technology for encoding digital data
- Veil Nebula, an astronomical object

== See also ==
- The Veil (disambiguation)
- Veiled (disambiguation)
- Vail (disambiguation)
- Vale (disambiguation)
- Vejle, a town in Denmark
