= HNoMS Vale =

Three ships of the Royal Norwegian Navy have borne the name HNoMS Vale, after Váli, son of the god Odin and the giantess Rindr:

- HNoMS Vale (1843) was a schooner.
- HNoMS Vale (1874) was a Vale-class Rendel gunboat built for the Royal Norwegian Navy at Karljohansvern Naval Yard in 1874.
- HNoMS Vale (N53) was minelayer built in 1978, and sold to the Latvian Navy in 2003.

== See also ==
- SS Vale, a German cargo ship also named after Váli.
