= Vallier =

Vallier is a topographic surname of French and Old English origin, referring to someone who lives in a valley. Variants include Vallière, Vallières, de Vallière, and LaVallière.

Notable people with the surname Vallier include:

- John Vallier (1920–1991), English classical pianist and composer
- Joseph Vallier (1869–1935), French lawyer and politician
- Lenny Vallier (born 1999), French footballer

Notable people with the surname Vallière include:

- Jean Vallière (died 1523), Augustinian friar
- Florent-Jean de Vallière (1667–1759), founded the Vallière system of artillery
- Louis-Florent de Vallière (1719–1775), Governor General of the French colony of Saint-Domingue (Haiti)

== See also ==
- Vale (disambiguation)
