= The Veil =

The Veil may refer to:

== Film and television ==
- The Veil (2016 film), an American supernatural horror film
- The Veil (2017 film), an American post-apocalyptic film
- The Veil (American TV series), a 1958 horror/supernatural anthology series hosted by Boris Karloff
- The Veil (South Korean TV series), a 2021 action thriller series
- The Veil (miniseries), a 2024 American thriller series

== Other uses ==
- The Veil (album), by bb&c, 2011
- The Veil, an album by Trust Obey, 1990
- The Veil, a 1987 poetry collection by Denis Johnson

== See also ==
- The Veils, an English/New Zealand indie rock band
- Veil (disambiguation)
