= Vallières =

Vallières may refer to:

== People ==
- Vincent Vallières (born 1978), Canadian singer
- Yvon Vallières (born 1949), Canadian politician
- Pierre Vallières (1938–1998), Canadian journalist and writer

== Places ==
- Vallières, Aube, a commune in the Aube department, France
- Vallières, Haute-Savoie, a former commune in the Haute-Savoie department, France
- Vallières (commune), a commune in the Nord-Est department, Haiti
- Vallières-sur-Fier, a commune in the Haute-Savoie department, France
- Vallières Arrondissement, an arrondissement in the Nord-Est department, Haiti

== See also ==
- Vallier and Vallière, surnames
- Vale (disambiguation)
