= Vail (disambiguation) =

Vail is a city in the U.S. state of Colorado.

Vail may also refer to:

== Places ==
In the United States

- Vail, Arizona
- Vail Ski Resort, in Vail, Colorado
- Vail, Iowa
- Salt Lick, Kentucky, formerly known as Vail
- Vail, Michigan
- Vail Township, Redwood County, Minnesota
- Vail, Pennsylvania
- Vail, Washington

== Other uses ==
- Vail (surname)
- Vail Resorts, an American mountain resort company
- Windows Home Server V2 code-named 'Vail'

== See also ==
- Vail Film Festival in Vail Colorado
- Vail Lake in California
