= SS Vale =

German cargo ship sunk in the Baltic in 1945

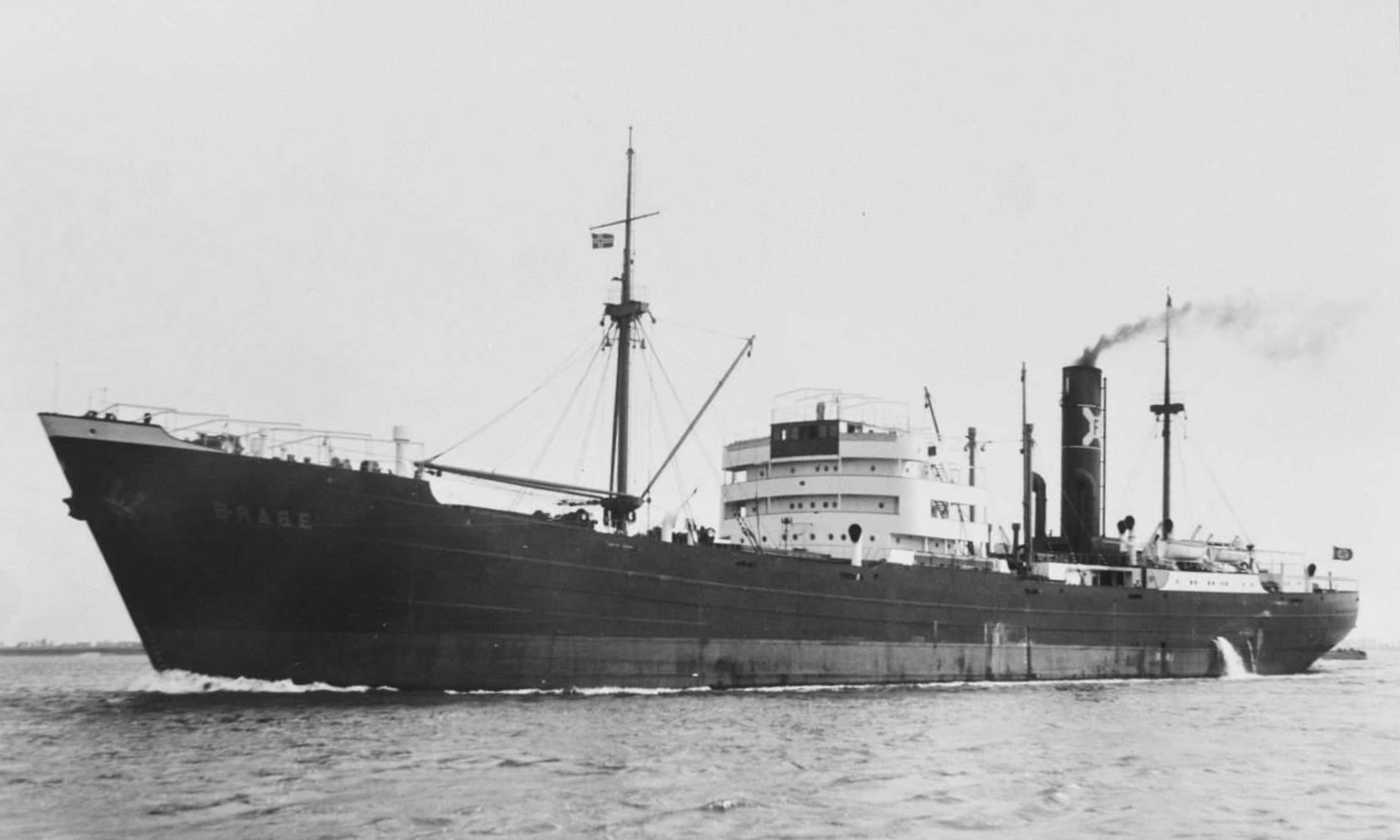
- Brage, one of Vale's sister ships, showing her raked bow.

History

Germany
- Name: Vale
- Namesake: Váli, son of Odin
- Owner: Seereederei „Frigga“
- Port of registry: Hamburg
- Builder: Nordseewerke, Emden
- Yard number: 192
- Completed: 1939
- Fate: Sunk by air attack, 1945

General characteristics
- Type: cargo ship
- Tonnage: 5,950 GRT, 3,020 NRT
- Length: 443.6 ft (135.2 m)
- Beam: 59.0 ft (18.0 m)
- Depth: 23.6 ft (7.2 m)
- Decks: 2
- Installed power: 1 × compound steam engine; 1 × exhaust steam turbine; 478 NHP
- Propulsion: 1 × screw
- Speed: 12 knots (22 km/h)
- Sensors & processing systems: wireless direction finding; echo sounding device
- Notes: sister ships: Widar, Brage, Sabine Howaldt, Klaus Howaldt

SS Vale was a cargo steamship that was built in Germany in 1939 for Seereederei „Frigga“. In the Second World War she carried German refugees and wounded in the evacuation of East Prussia in 1945. A Soviet air attack sank her that April, killing about 250 of the people aboard her.

She was the first of two Seereederei „Frigga“ ships to be called Vale. The second was a motor ship that was completed in 1957.

== One of five sisters ==
Between 1935 and 1939, Nordseewerke Emden built three sister ships for Seereederei „Frigga“, a shipping company with which it had close links. The „Frigga“ company named its ships after Norse gods. Yard number 176 was completed in 1935 as Widar, after Víðarr. Yard number 186 was completed in 1937 as Bragge, after Bragi. Yard number 192 was completed in 1939 as Vale, after Váli. All were built to the same design and specification.

In 1938, Nordseewerke also built two ships to the same design for the Bernhardt Howaldt shipping company in Flensburg. Yard number 188 was completed as Sabine Howaldt, and yard number 189 was completed as Klaus Howaldt.

== Specifications ==
Vale's registered length was 443.6 ft (135.2 m), her beam was 59.0 ft (18.0 m), and her depth was 23.6 ft (7.2 m). Her tonnages were 5,950 GRT and 3,020 NRT. She had a cruiser stern, and a raked bow. She had four cargo hatches: two forward of her bridge, one amidships between her bridge and her funnel, and one aft.

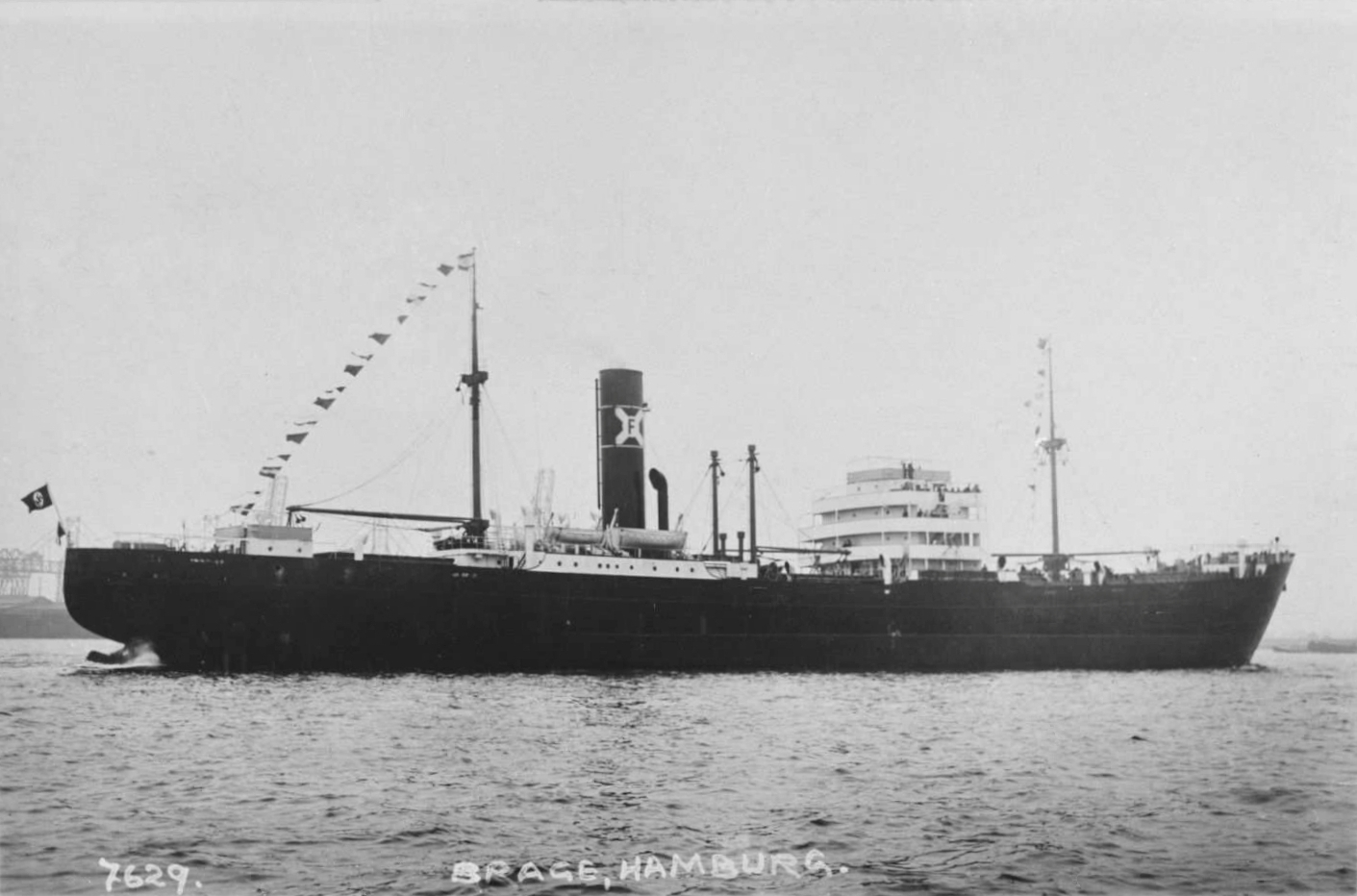
Brage, one of Vale's sister ships, showing her cruiser stern, and the separation between her bridge and the superstructure around her funnel.

Vale had a single screw. Rheinmetall-Borsig in Tegel, Berlin, built her engines. Her main engine was a four-cylinder compound steam engine, with two high-pressure and two low-pressure cylinders. Exhaust steam from its low-pressure cylinders drove an exhaust steam turbine, which drove the same propeller shaft via a Föttinger fluid coupling and double reduction gearing. The combined power output of her two engines was rated at 478 NHP, and gave her a speed of 12 knots (22 km/h).

Vale's navigation equipment included wireless direction finding, and an echo sounding device. She was equipped with wireless telegraphy, but her maritime call sign was never entered in Lloyd's Register, possibly because the beginning of the Second World War intervened. She was registered in Hamburg.

== Career and loss ==
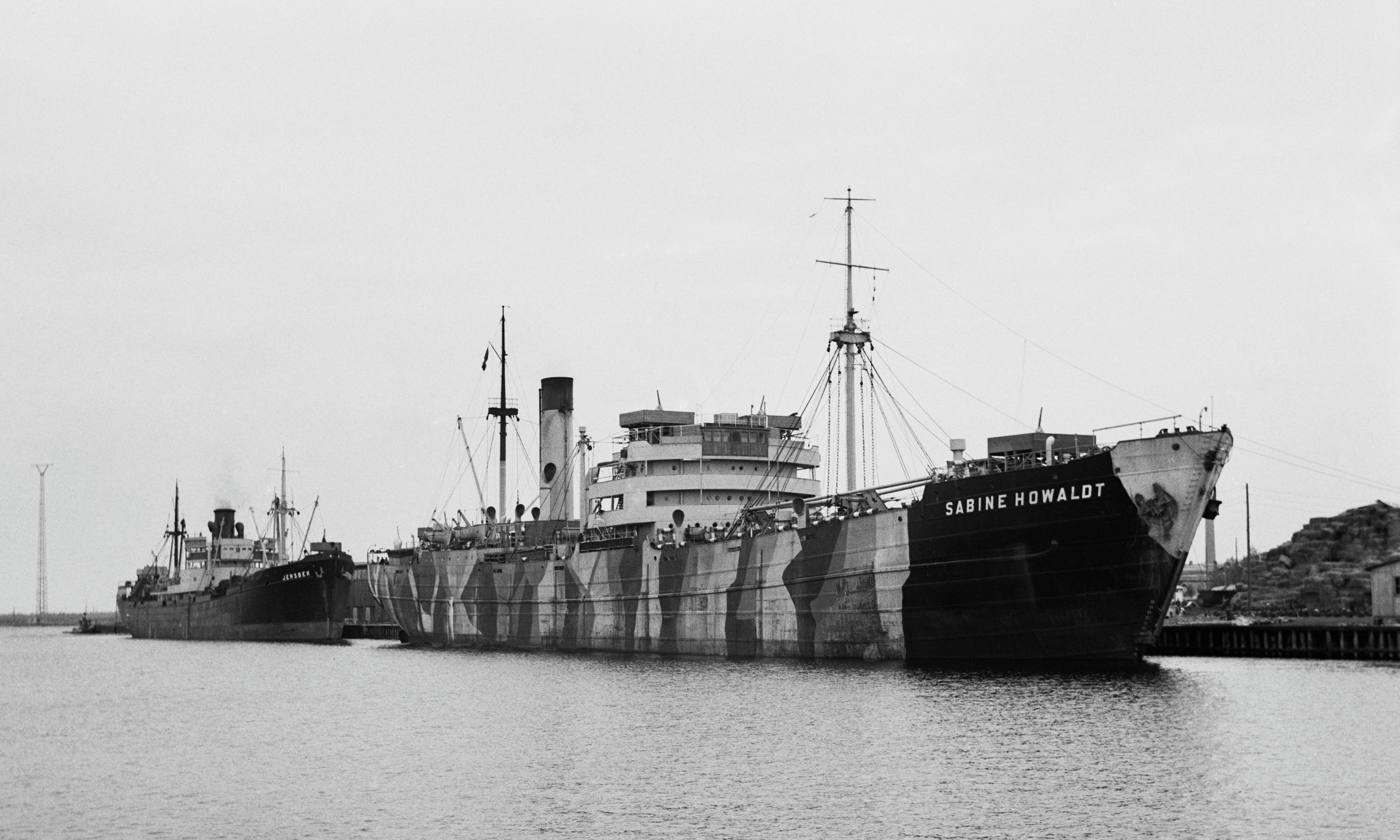
Sabine Howaldt, one of Vale's sister ships, in 1942. She is painted in camouflage colours, and has anti-aircraft guns on raised platforms on her fo'c's'le and flying bridge.

In April and May 1941, Vale was off the west coast of Norway, heading north. On 27 June she arrived on Stavanger from Kristiansand.

By May 1944, all four of Vale's sister ships had been sunk. Mines sank Brage in May 1940; Widar in March 1941; and Sabine Howaldt in May 1944. An RAAF Hampden aircraft torpedoed Klaus Howaldt in May 1943.

On 13 January 1945, Soviet forces began the East Prussian offensive. On 20 January, German authorities began the evacuation of East Prussia to move millions of German refugees and wounded westward, away from the approaching Eastern Front. Most were moved by sea in Operation Hannibal, in ships leaving Danzig (now Gdańsk), Gotenhafen (now Gdynia), and Pillau (now Baltiysk). Soviet submarines sank some of the ships, including the liners Wilhelm Gustloff on 30 January and Steuben on 10 February, killing thousands of refugees in each case.

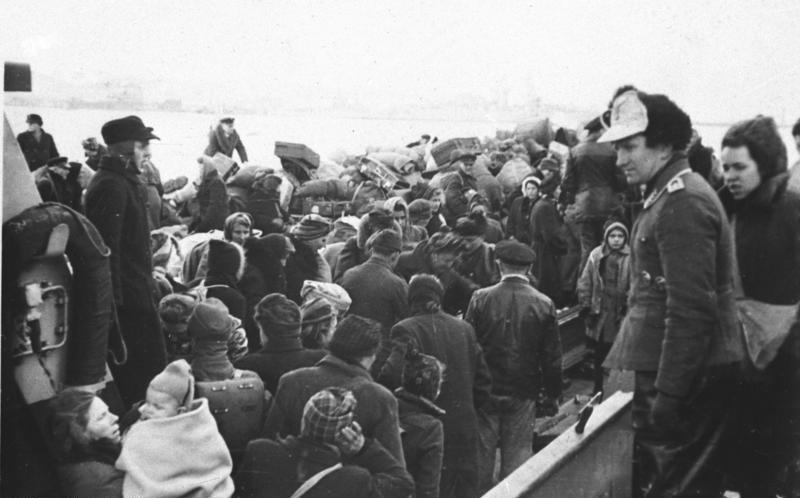
German refugees boarding a ship in Pillau (now Baltiysk) in early 1945.

On or just before 22 March, Vale landed hundreds of refugees and wounded at Swinemünde (now Świnoujście), where fishing boats took them across the Oder Lagoon to Ueckermünde. She then returned to East Prussia.

As the Battle of Königsberg continued, tens of thousands of refugees gathered in Pillau, about 25 miles (40 km) west of the city, to be evacuated by sea. Soviet air attacks at sea off Pillau sank ships including Hamburg Süd's Mendoza on 22 March; „Frigga“'s Vale on 9 April; and Norddeutscher Lloyd's Weserstein on 12 April. The sinking of Vale killed about 250 people.

== Bibliography ==
- Lloyd's Register of Shipping. Vol. II.–Steamers and Motorships of 300 tons gross and over. London: Lloyd's Register of Shipping. 1941 – via Southampton City Council.
- Rohwer, Jürgen; Hümmelchen, Gerhard (1968). Chronik des Seekrieges 1939–1945 (in German). Oldenburg: Stalling – via Württembergische Landesbibliothek.
