= Vale, West Virginia =

- Unincorporated community
- Location within West Virginia Location within the United States
- Coordinates: 37°52′49″N 80°43′18″W
- Country: United States
- State: West Virginia
- County: Greenbrier
- Elevation: 2,431 ft (741 m)
- Time zone: UTC-5 (Eastern (EST))
  - Summer (DST): UTC-4 (EDT)
- Area codes: 304 & 681
- GNIS feature ID: 1549966

Vale is an unincorporated community in Greenbrier County, West Virginia, United States. Vale is 6 miles (9.7 km) south-southwest of Rupert.

The community was named for a vale near the original town site.
