= Vallière system =

French artillery system

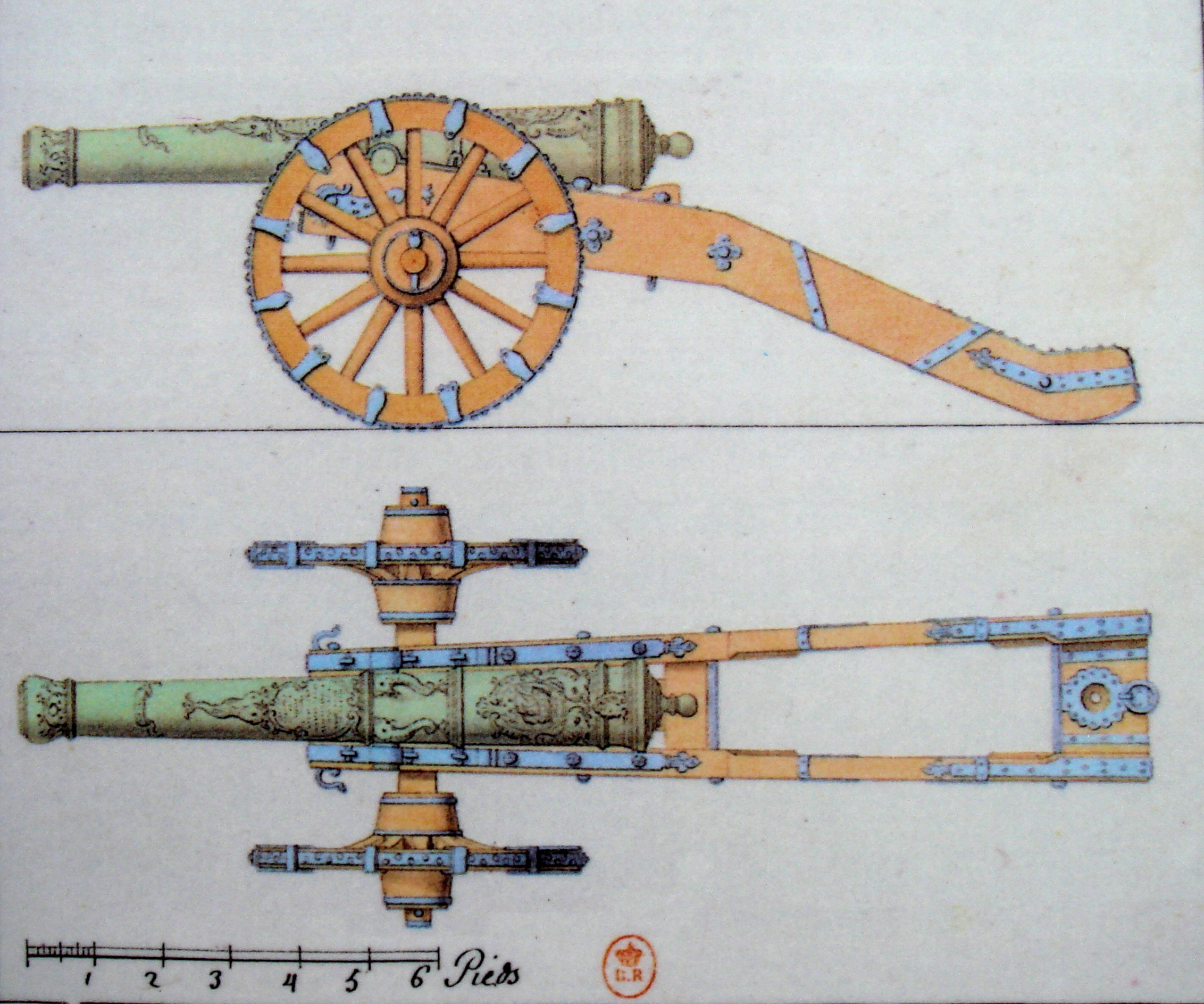
- French Vallière cannon
- Type: Artillery
- Place of origin: Kingdom of France

Service history
- In service: 1732–1756, 1772–1774
- Used by: Kingdom of France; United States
- Wars: War of the Polish Succession; War of the Austrian Succession; Seven Years' War; American War of Independence

Production history
- Designer: Florent-Jean de Vallière
- Designed: 1732

The Vallière system was a new system of artillery introduced by Jean-Florent de Vallière and adopted by the French Royal Army in the 1730s. Under the new system, artillery pieces were produced in only five different calibers of cannons and three sizes of mortars. Henceforth, all new artillery pieces were manufactured in France to standard sizes. Previously, there was no standard system in place, so that the artillery included guns of various calibers and different nations of manufacture.

In the War of the Austrian Succession in the 1740s, the Vallière system began to reveal its shortcomings. Though the smaller caliber guns were considered to be suitable for field artillery, in fact, they were too heavy to quickly maneuver on the battlefield. Though the gun barrels were standardized, the gun carriages, limbers, and other vehicles were not standardized. After the same problems hampered the French artillery in the Seven Years' War, the French Army began replacing the Vallière system with the lighter field artillery of the Gribeauval system in 1765.

== Background ==
The problem with French artillery up to the 1720s was that the cannons were manufactured in different nations and were of various calibers. In 1690, for example, there were Spanish 24-pounders and 12-pounders, and French 33-pounders, 16-pounders, 8-pounders, and 4-pounders. However, each of these types came in three thicknesses. The "doubly-fortified" had the thickest metal, the "legitimate" had less thick metal, and the "bastard" had the thinnest metal. Worse, a 33-pound round shot manufactured in one French foundry might not fit a 33-pounder gun produced by a different French foundry. In 1700, the standard range of cannons available to the French Royal Army were 36-, 24-, 18-, 16-, 12-, 8-, 6-, 4-pounders. All were very heavy artillery pieces. The 36-pounder was over 7,300 lb (3,311 kg) and more than 11.25 ft (3.4 m) long. The 4-pounder was over 1,500 lb (680 kg) and more than 7.75 ft (2.4 m) long. Supplying such a wide assortment of ammunition calibers was a logistical nightmare. (Note: Note that these are measured in French pounds (livres) and French feet (12 pouces). French units are slightly larger than English units.)

The Artillerie de Nouvelle Invention had also been introduced to the French Royal Army by Lieutenant General François Frézeau de La Frézelière, but never fully adopted. This system had been developed in 1679 by Antonio Gonzales, a Spaniard, and consisted of a range of fairly lightweight cannons. The Artillerie de Nouvelle Invention proved to have recoil problems; it was never fully adopted and finally discontinued in 1720. Oddly, the system's 4-pounder, 8-pounder, and 12-pounder cannons turned out to be similar in weight to the Gribeauval system's guns of the 1760s.

== New system ==
=== Reduction of calibers ===
On 7 October 1732, the Vallière system replaced all earlier artillery systems employed by the French Royal Army. The intention was to reduce the number of calibers, standardize the manufacture of the new gun barrels, and produce all new artillery pieces in France. In this, the system was a success. Whereas numerous formats and designs had been in place in the French army, Jean-Florent de Vallière standardized the French sizes in artillery pieces by allowing only for the production of 24-pounder, 16-pounder, 12-pounder, 8-pounder and 4-pounder cannons, mortars of 12-inch and 8-inch, and stone-throwing (pierrier) mortars of 15-inch.

Vallière was believed to have taken part in 60 sieges and 10 battles, and he was promoted to the rank of lieutenant general. With his extensive background in siege warfare, Vallière designed all the new cannons to be used as field, siege, and garrison artillery. He chose the calibers that were manufactured at the Douai foundry in 1680 and imposed them on all other French cannon foundries. The new guns were employed for the first time in the War of the Polish Succession (1733–1738). The Vallière cannons were very well designed and had good accuracy.

Diagrams of Vallière cannons and mortars
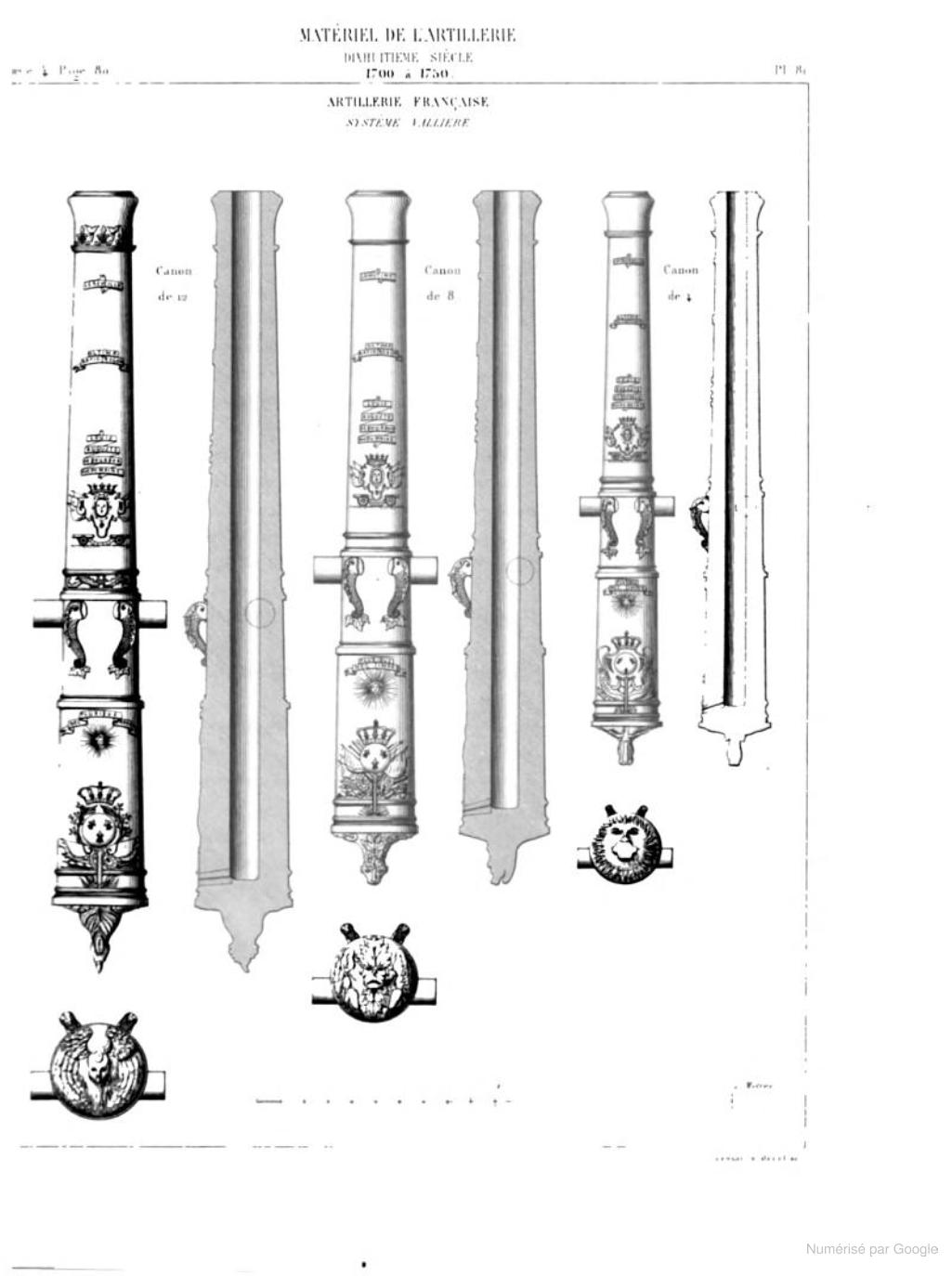
12-, 8-, and 4-pounder Vallière cannons

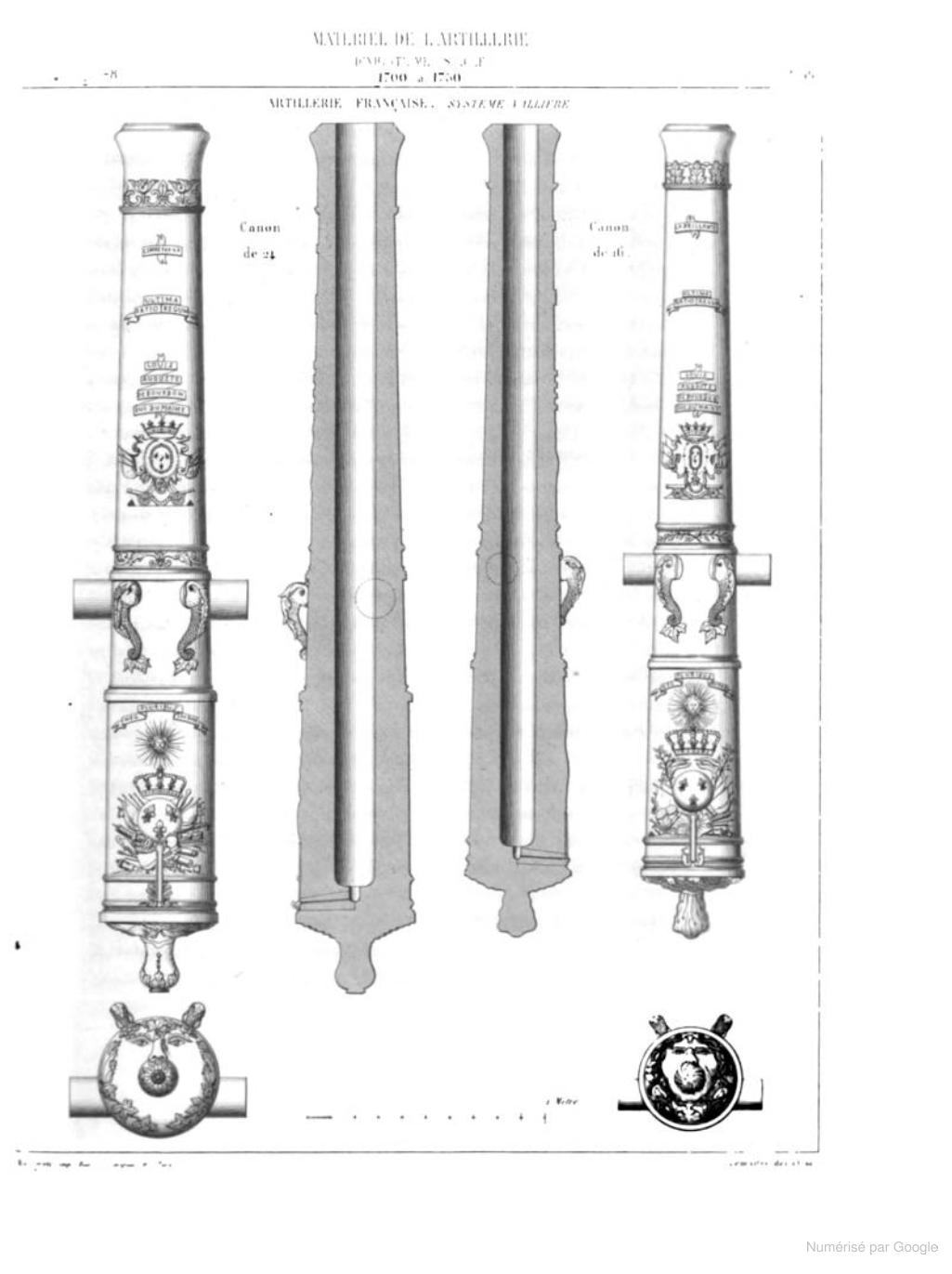
24- and 16-pounder Vallière cannons

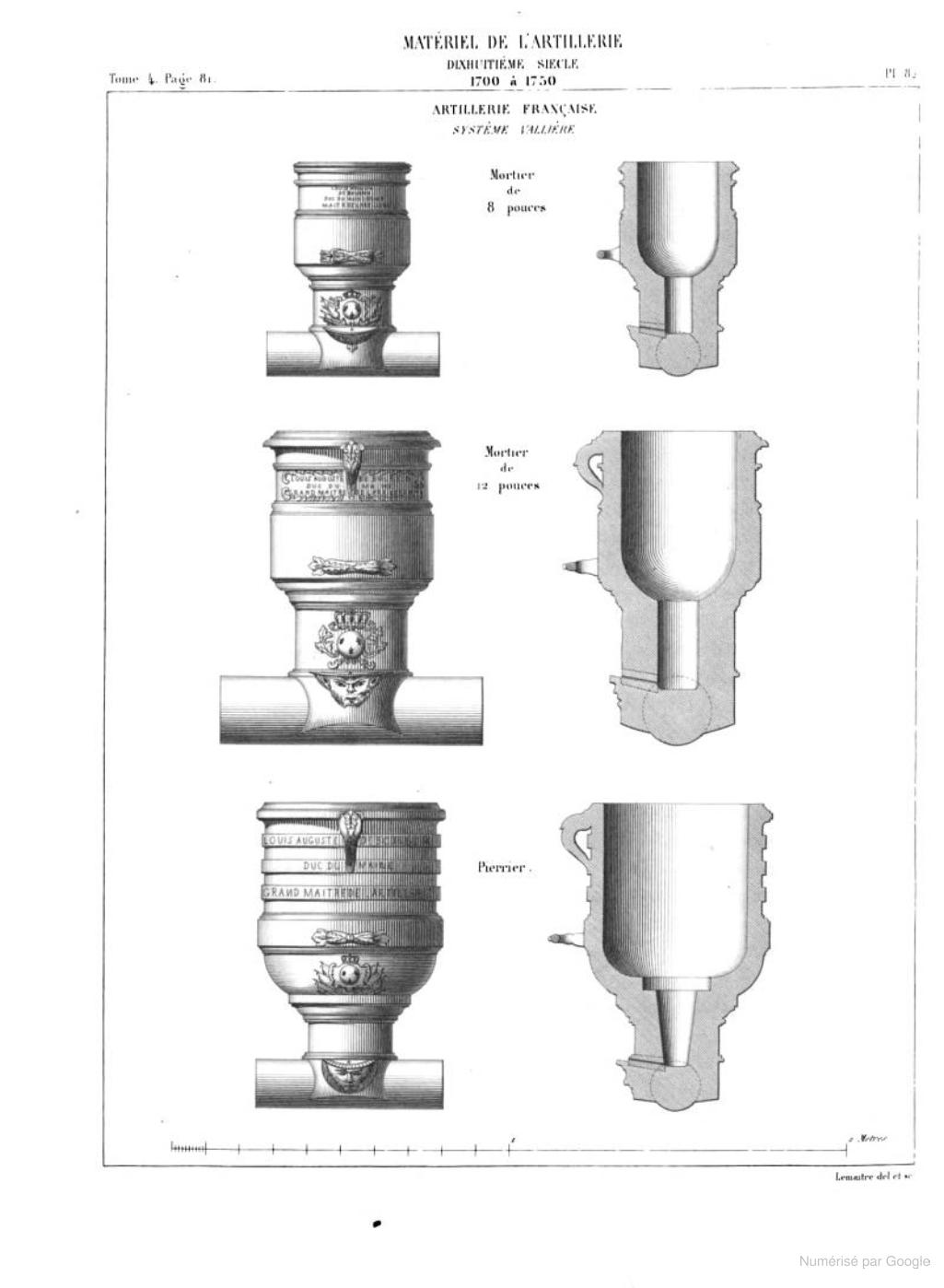
8- and 12-inch and pierrier 15-inch Vallière mortars

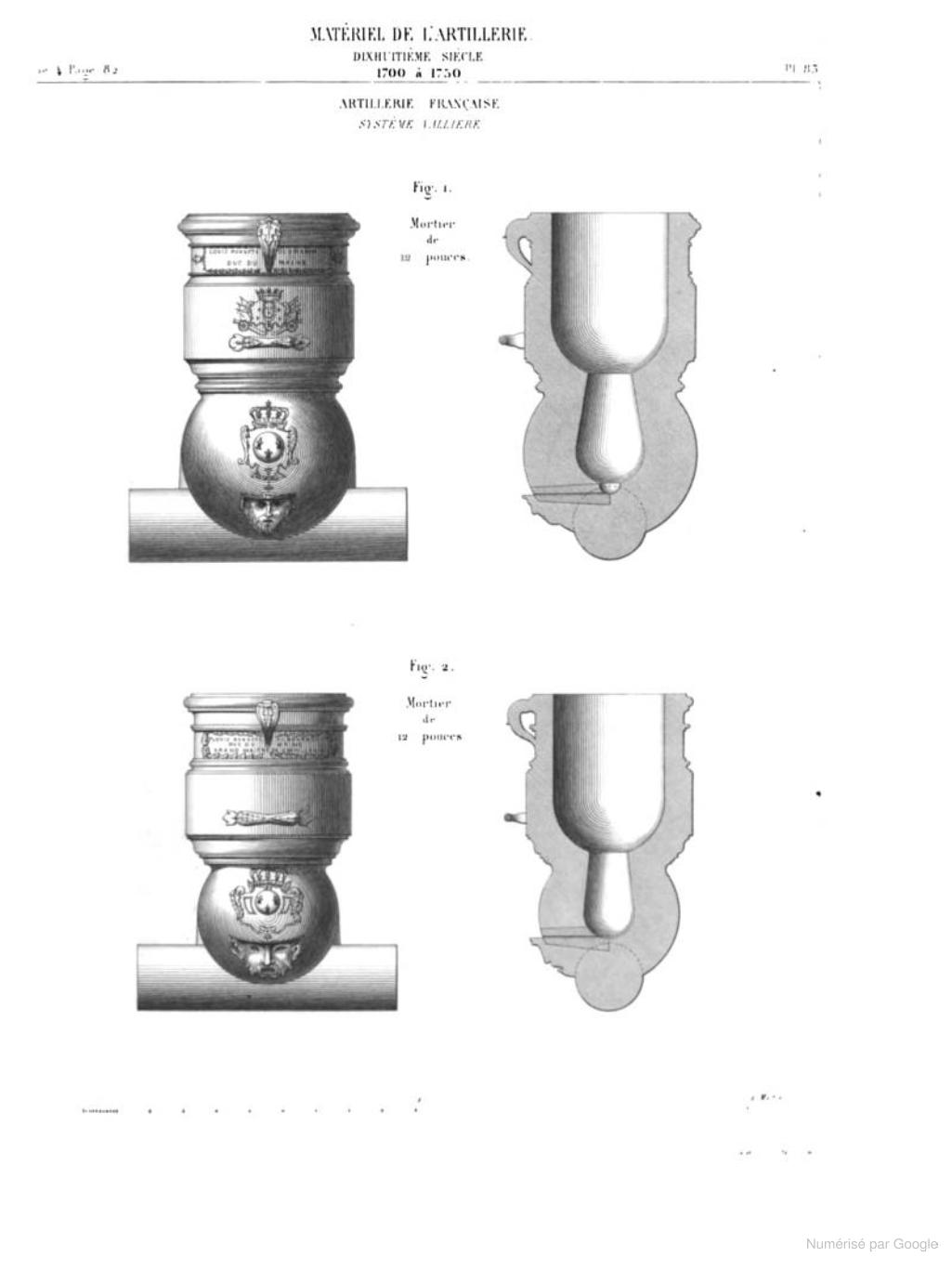
Additional 12-inch Vallière mortars

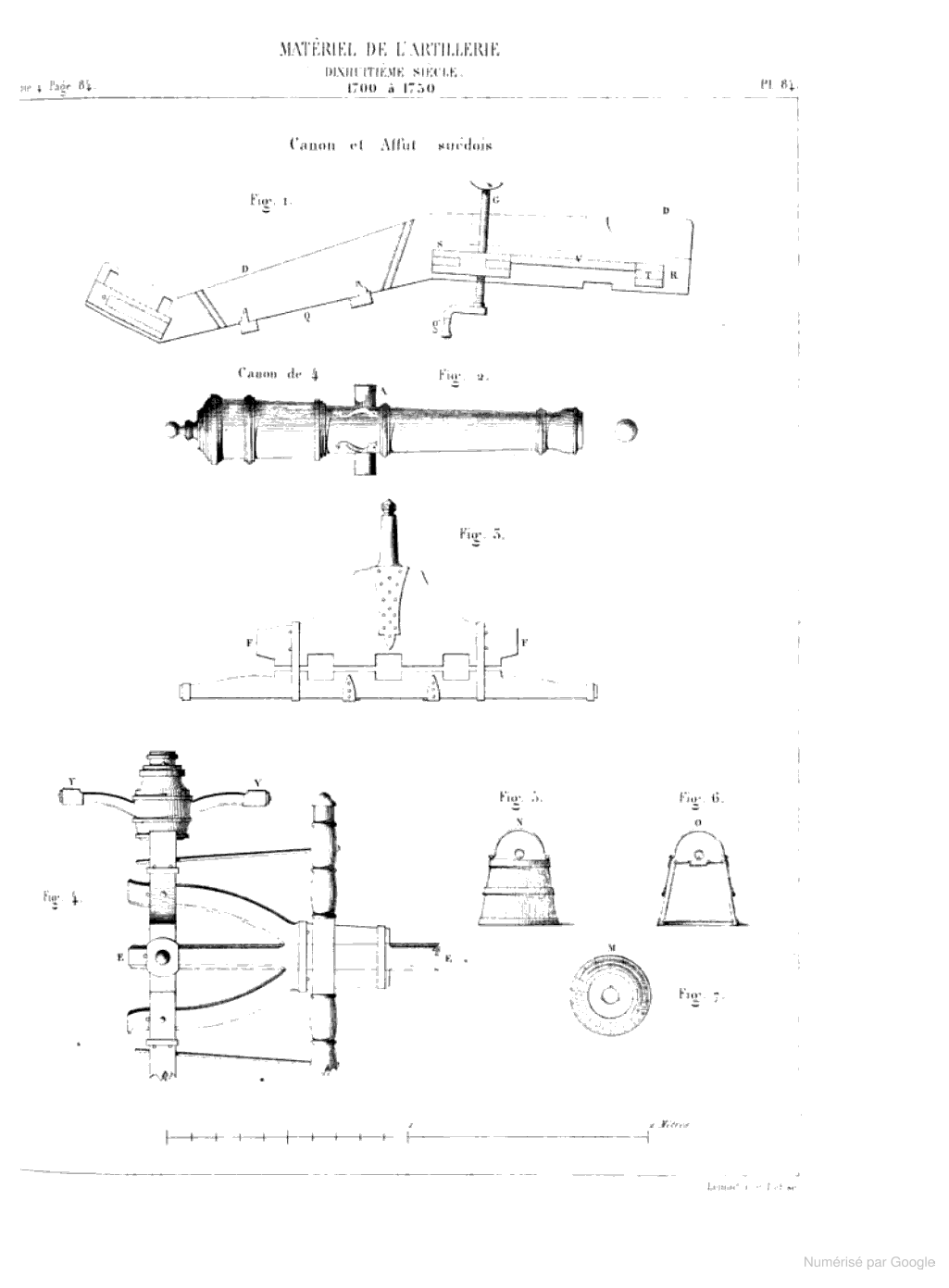
4-pounder Swedish gun from the Vallière era

Caliber is normally measured as the inner diameter of the gun barrel (bore). However, in the 1700s, caliber was often measured by the weight of a round shot. Hence, a 4-pounder gun fired a 4 lb (1.8 kg) cannonball. Note that French measures of weight and length were slightly larger than corresponding English (Imperial) measures. A French pound (livre) was equal to 489.41 g (1.079 lb) while an English pound was equal to 453.6 g (grams). This meant that a French 12-pounder threw a heavier round shot than an English 12-pounder. A French inch (pouce) was equal to 2.707 cm (1.066 in).

Vallière system bore, total weight, and number of horses needed
Caliber	Bore width	Gun + carriage weight	No. horses needed
4-pounder	84.0 mm (3.31 in)	?	4
8-pounder	106.0 mm (4.17 in)	2,300 kg (5,071 lb)	6
12-pounder	121.3 mm (4.78 in)	2,900 kg (6,393 lb)	8
16-pounder	134.5 mm (5.30 in)	3,500 kg (7,716 lb)	12
24-pounder	152.5 mm (6.00 in)	4,300 kg (9,480 lb)	16

In 1689, France set up its first artillery school at Douai. In 1720, additional artillery schools were established at Grenoble, La Fère, Metz, Perpignan, and Strasbourg. These were the first schools of their type in Europe and they were copied by other nations, including the United States Military Academy which was founded in 1802. In 1734, Jean Maritz the elder invented the horizontal boring machine in which bronze cannons were cast solid, then bored out. This enabled cannons to be manufactured with greater accuracy. The French Navy adopted this method first, followed by the army. The new artillery pieces were produced at the Douai, Lyon, and Strasbourg cannon foundries. The barrels of Vallière guns were adorned with intricate ornamentation. Also, the handles were made to resemble dolphins. These details made it simple to identify the caliber of the artillery piece at a glance.

=== Barrel ===
The back part occasionally included an inscription showing the weight of the cannonball (for example a "4" for a 4-pounder), followed by the Latin inscription "Nec pluribus impar," a motto of King Louis XIV and translated literally as "not unequal to many," but ascribed various meanings including "alone against all," "none his equal," or "capable of anything" among many others. This was followed by the royal crest of the Bourbon dynasty. The location and date of manufacture were inscribed (in the example "Strasbourg, 1745") at the bottom of the gun, and finally the name and title of the founder (in the example, "Fondu par Jean Maritz, Commissaire des Fontes").

Various Vallière gun barrels
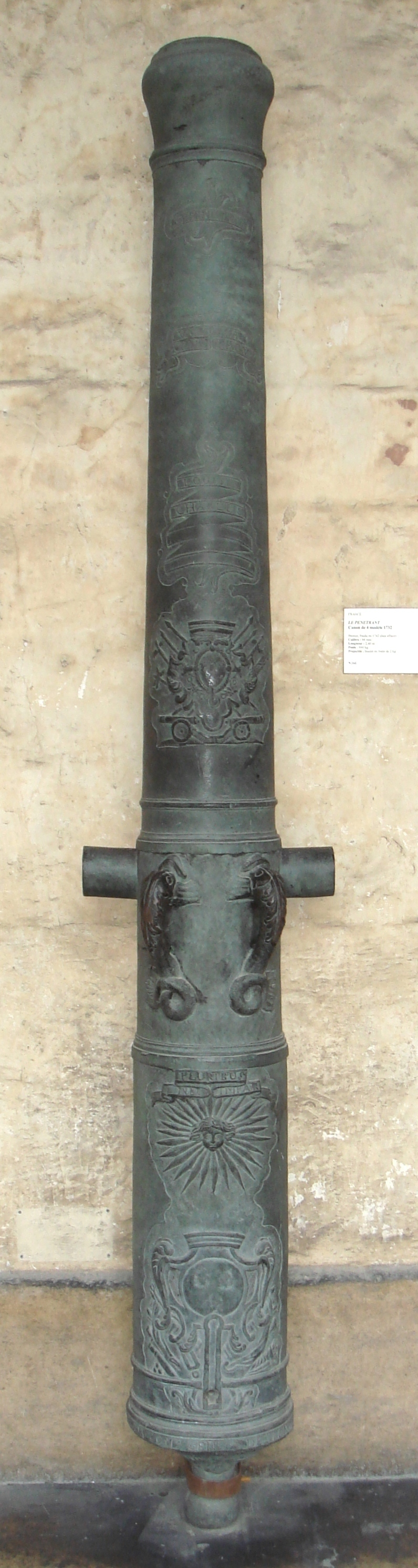
Canon de 4 de Vallière, 1732, Le Pénétrant. Caliber: 84 mm.

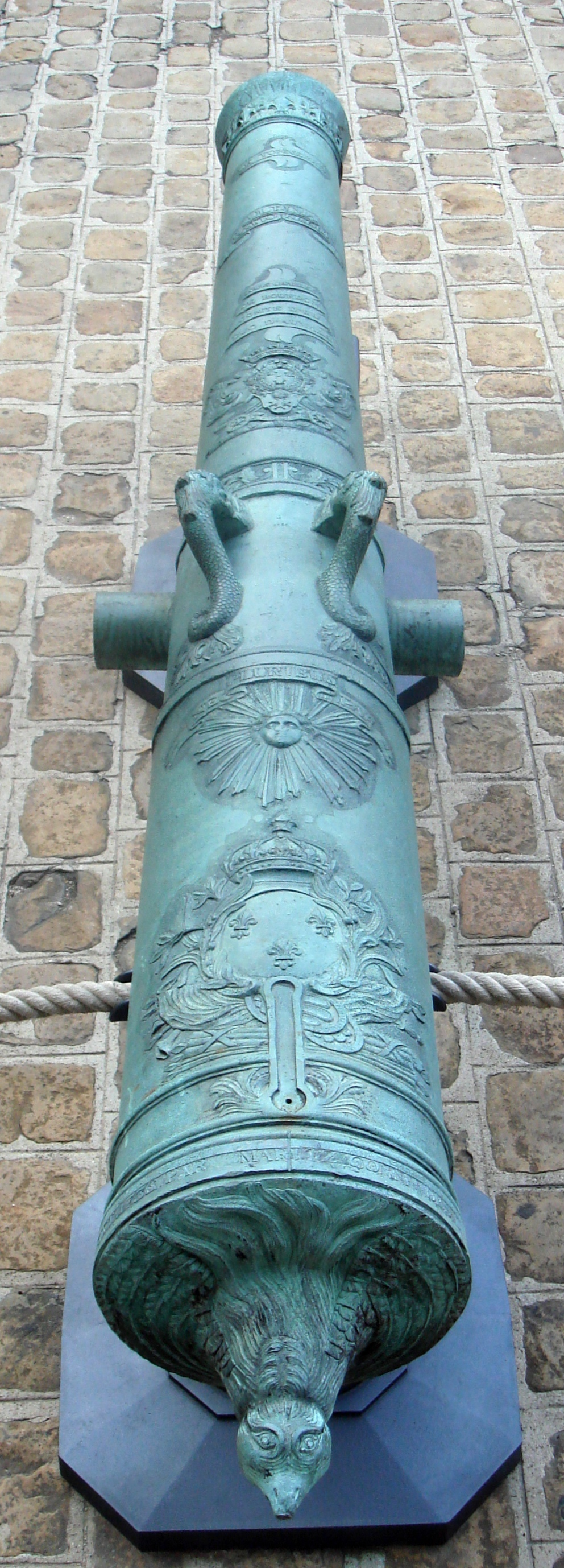
A Canon de 12 de Vallière, founded by Jean Maritz in 1736. Caliber: 121 mm. Length: 290 cm.

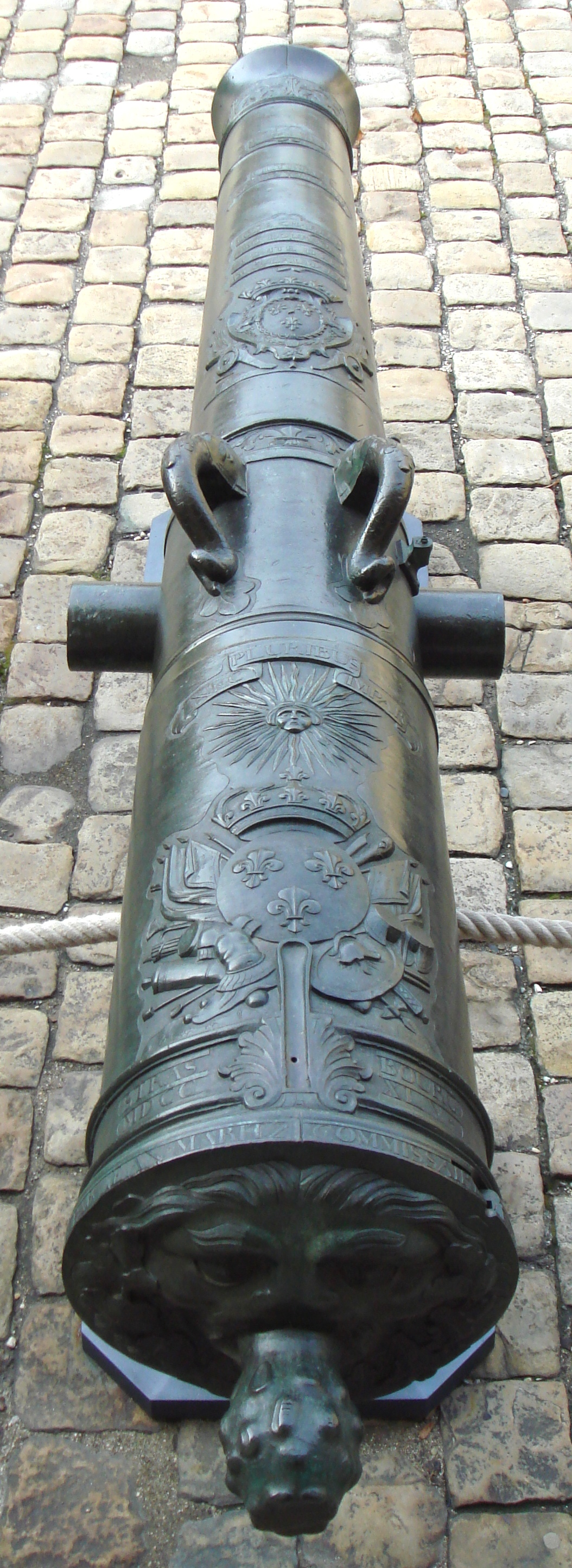
A 24-pdr gun of de Vallière system (Canon de 24 de Vallière, Uranie), founded by Jean Maritz in 1745.

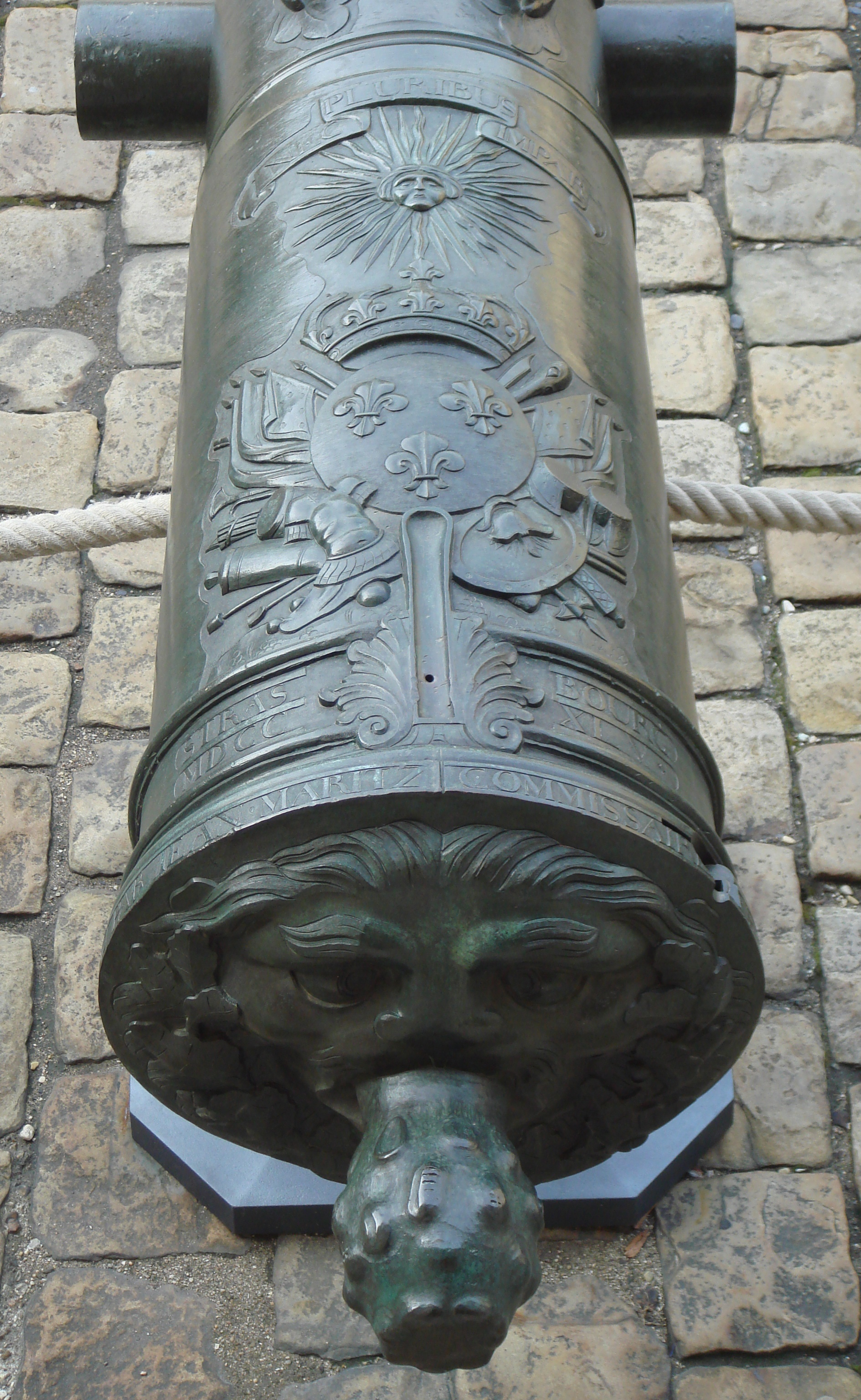
Back part of the de Valliere 24-pdr gun Uranie.

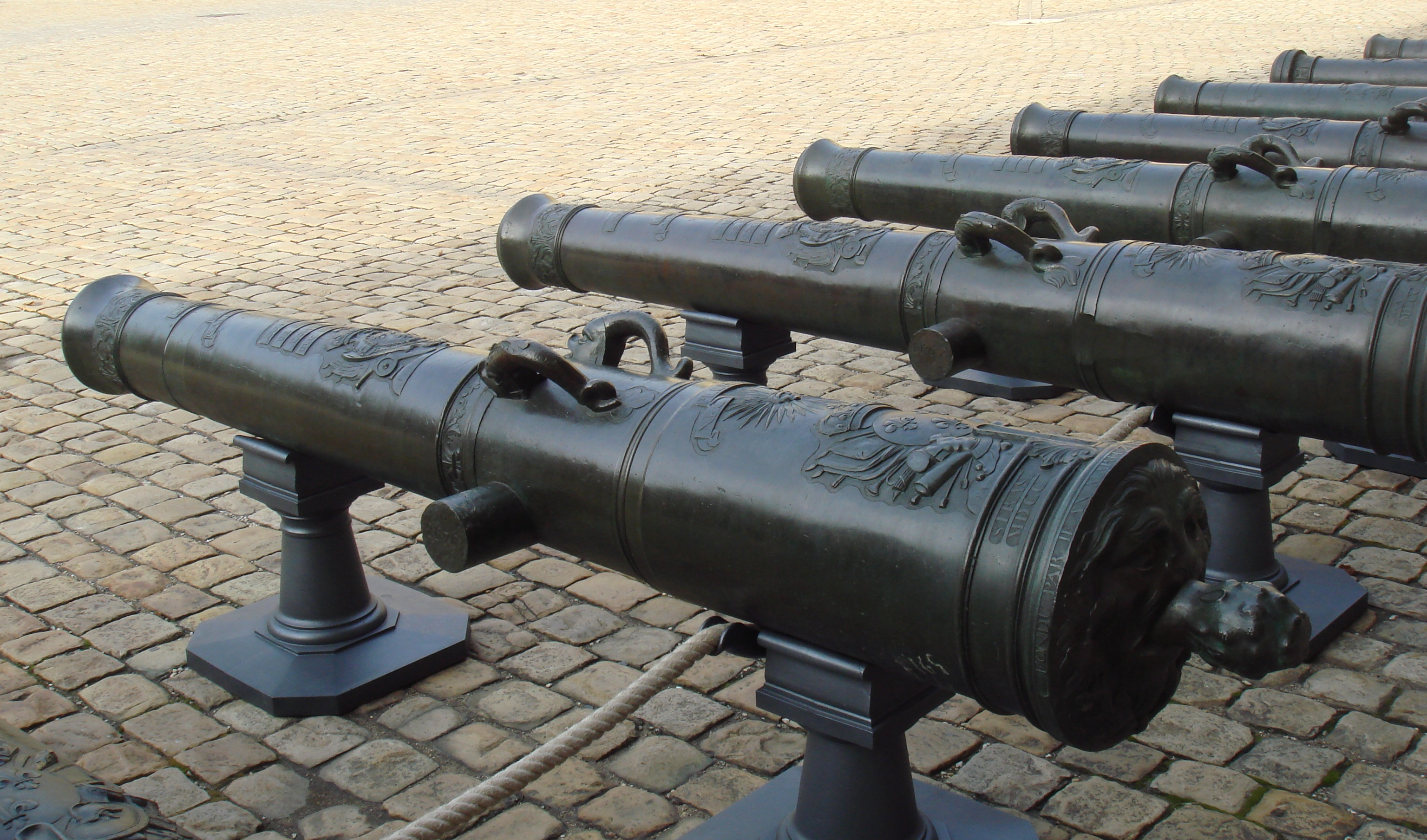
De Vallière 24-pdr guns, Les Invalides.

=== Breech design ===
Vallière cannons had cascabel designs which allowed an observer to easily recognize their rating: a 4-pounder would have a "Face in a sunburst", an 8-pounder a "Monkey's head", a 12-pounder a "Rooster's head", a 16-pounder a "Medusa's head", and a 24-pounder a "Bacchus head".

Breech design of Vallière guns
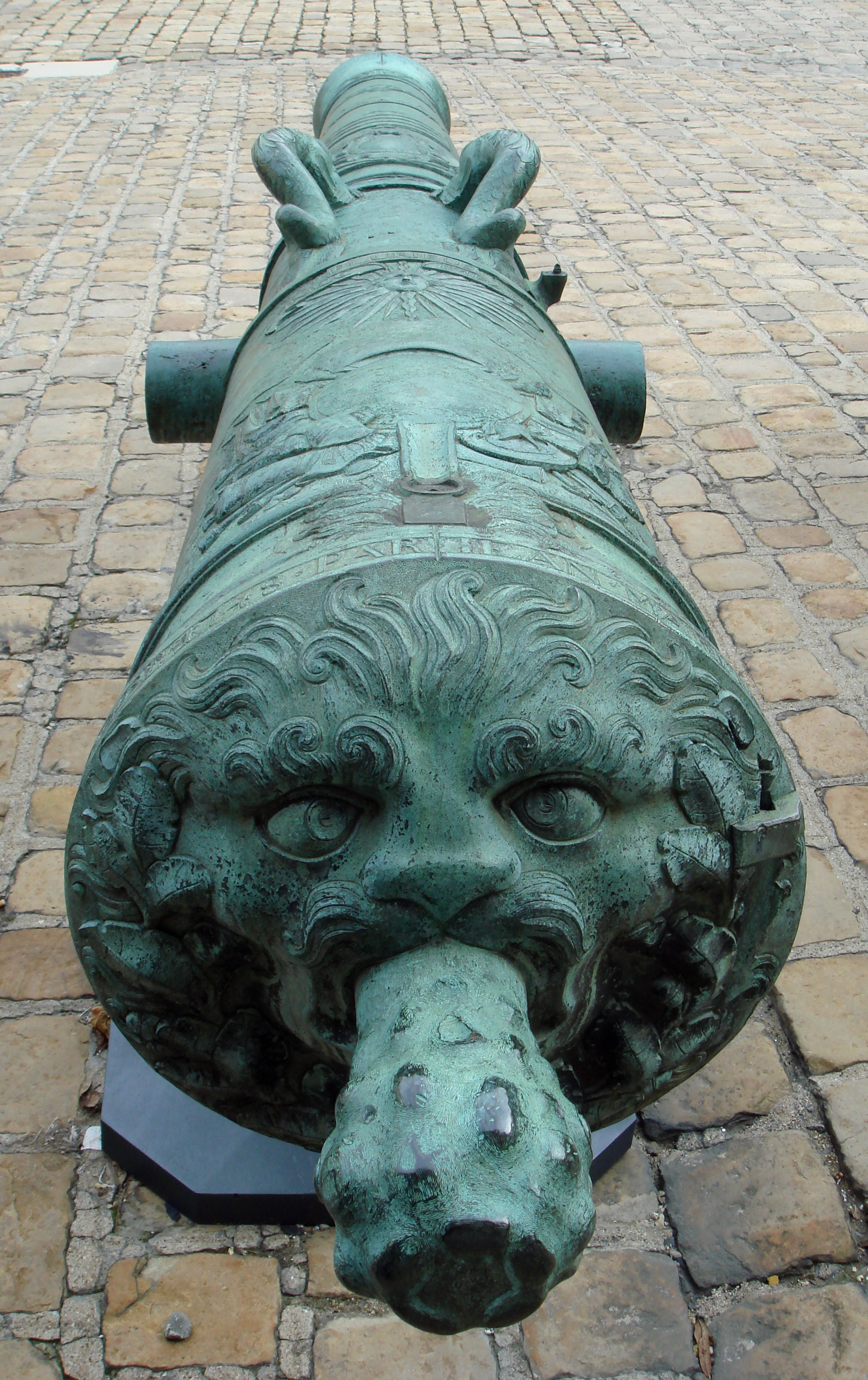
Lion head of 24-pounder. Caliber: 151 mm.

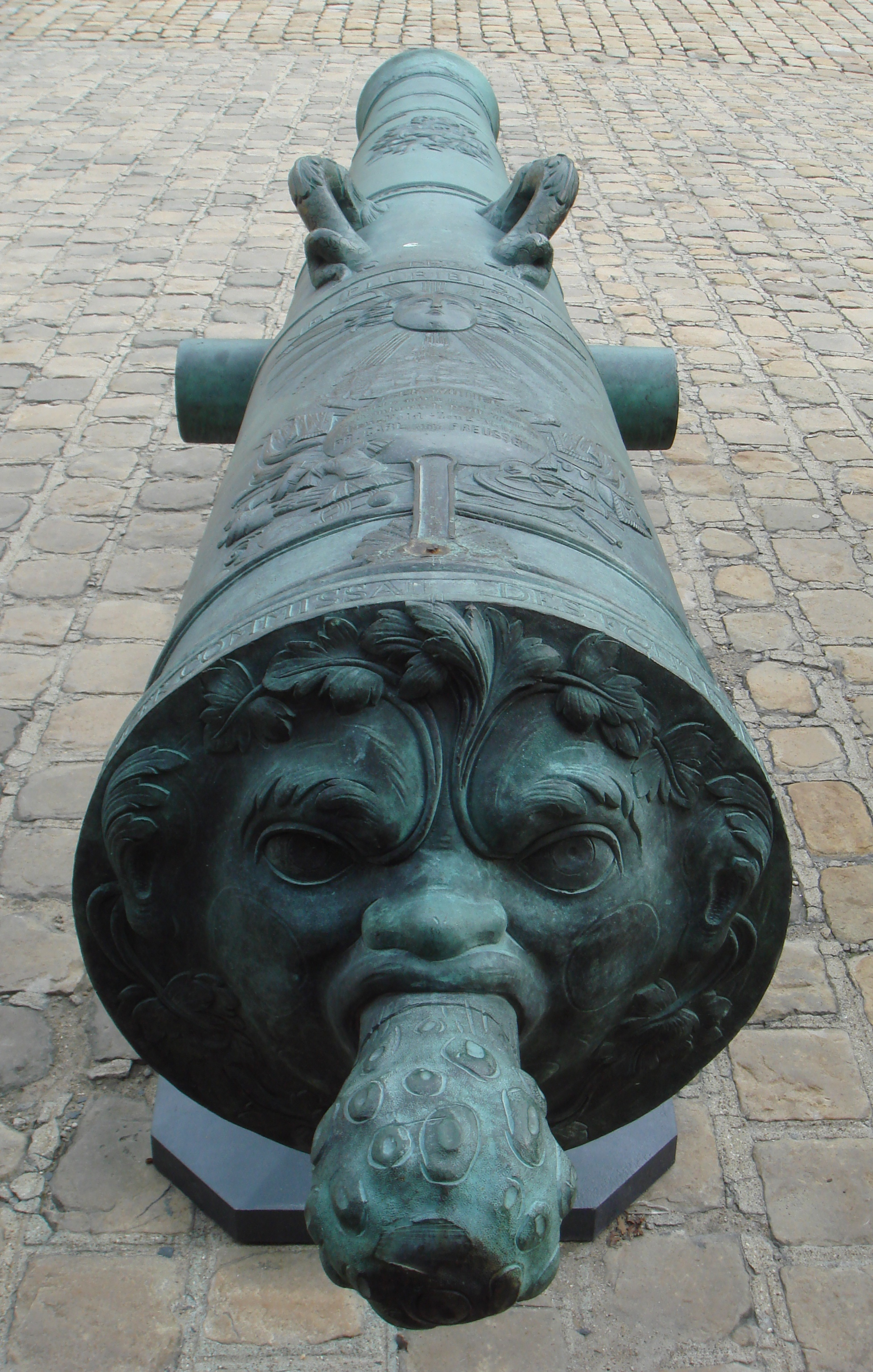
Bacchus head of
24-pounder. Caliber: 151 mm.

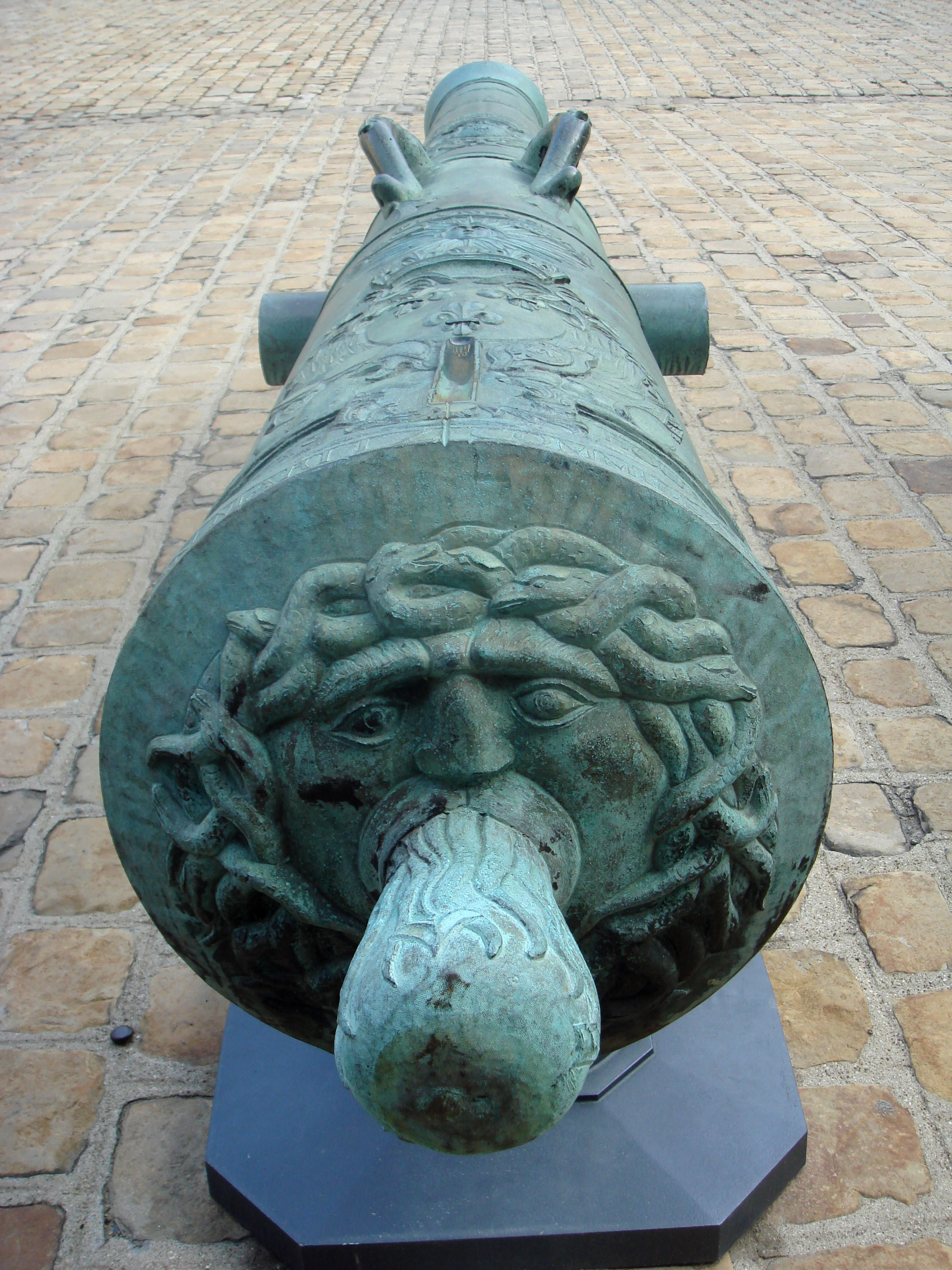
Medusa head of
16-pounder. Caliber: 134 mm.

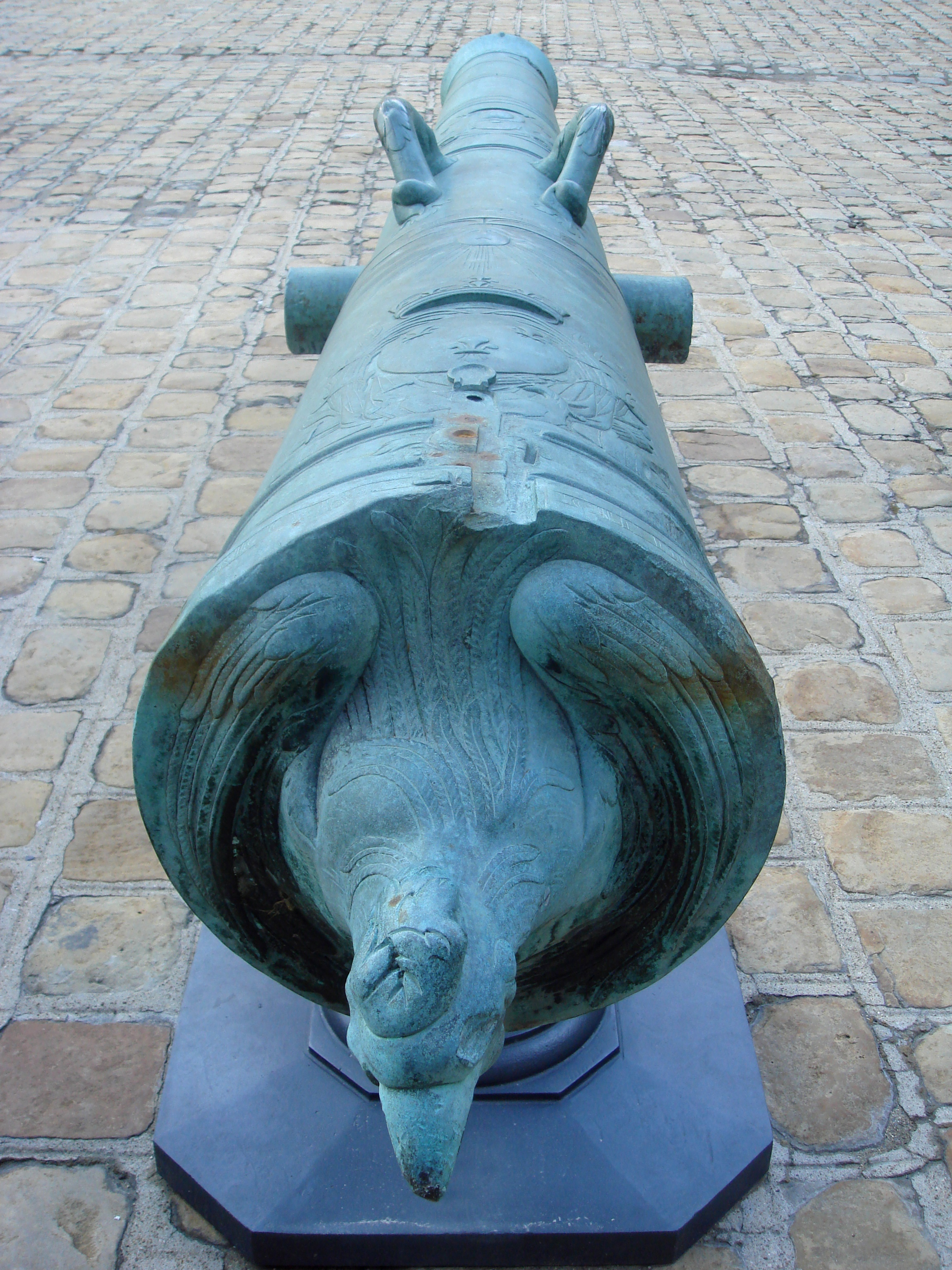
Rooster head of
12-pounder. Caliber: 121 mm.

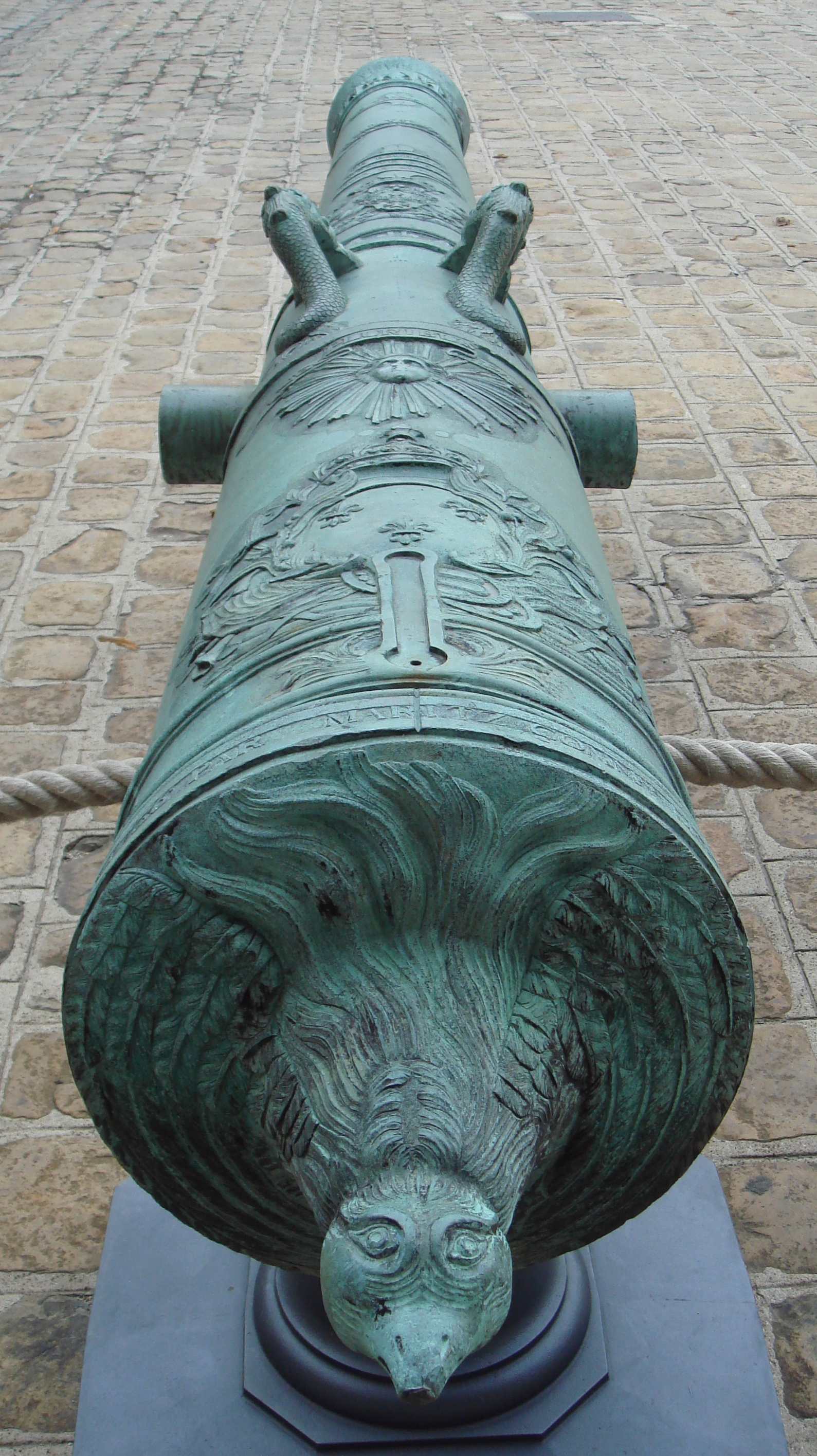
Bird head of 12-pounder Le Tonnerre. Caliber: 121 mm.

=== European wars ===
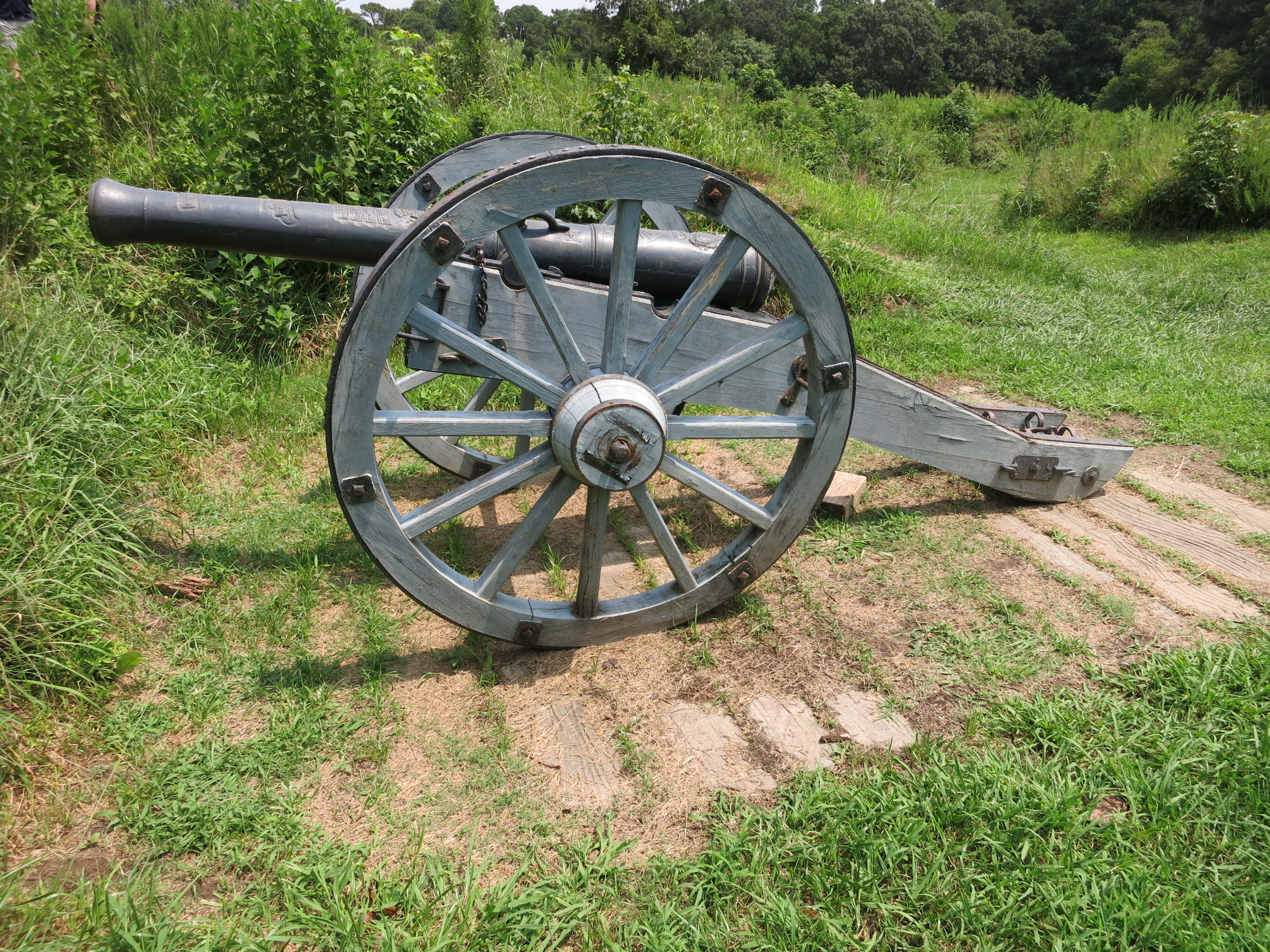
4-pounder Vallière cannon La Souris is located at Colonial National Historical Park in Yorktown, Virginia.

The Vallière guns proved rather good in siege warfare but were less satisfactory in a war of movement. During the 1730s, the new cannons performed acceptably. Vallière believed it was unwise to make different cannons for siege and field artillery. The result was that his one-size-fits-all guns were appropriate for sieges, but unsuitable for use in the field because they were too heavy. The cannons were designed with great length (and therefore weight) so that the gun barrels would protrude from the embrasures of fortifications. If the barrel was too short, the blast might damage the stonework. The 4-, 8-, and 12-pounders were considered field artillery. However, during the War of the Austrian Succession (1740–1748), these guns proved to be too heavy to maneuver in the field. Therefore, commanders like Maurice de Saxe employed lighter artillery pieces.

In fact, as early as 1738, Duke Charles of Belle-Isle proposed copying a Swedish 4-pounder cannon that weighed much less than the Vallière 4-pounder. Though not official until 1757, 50 of the so-called Saxe 4-pounders or 4-pounders à la Suédois were manufactured for the French army. These cannons were consigned to the artillery park to be used at the army commander's discretion. In 1744, the 60-gun Flanders artillery park included forty Vallière 4-pounders and ten Swedish 4-pounders. In 1745, the Flanders artillery park numbered 100 guns, including thirty-six Vallière 4-pounders and fifty Swedish 4-pounders. After the Battle of Fontenoy in May 1745, the Swedish gun fell out of favor. In 1748, the French artillery train in Flanders included fourteen 16-pounders organized in two brigades, sixteen 12-pounders in two brigades, thirty 8-pounders in three brigades, eighty 4-pounders in eight brigades, and ten Swedish 4-pounders in one brigade. Altogether, the train counted 150 guns, 397 wagons, and 2,965 horses.

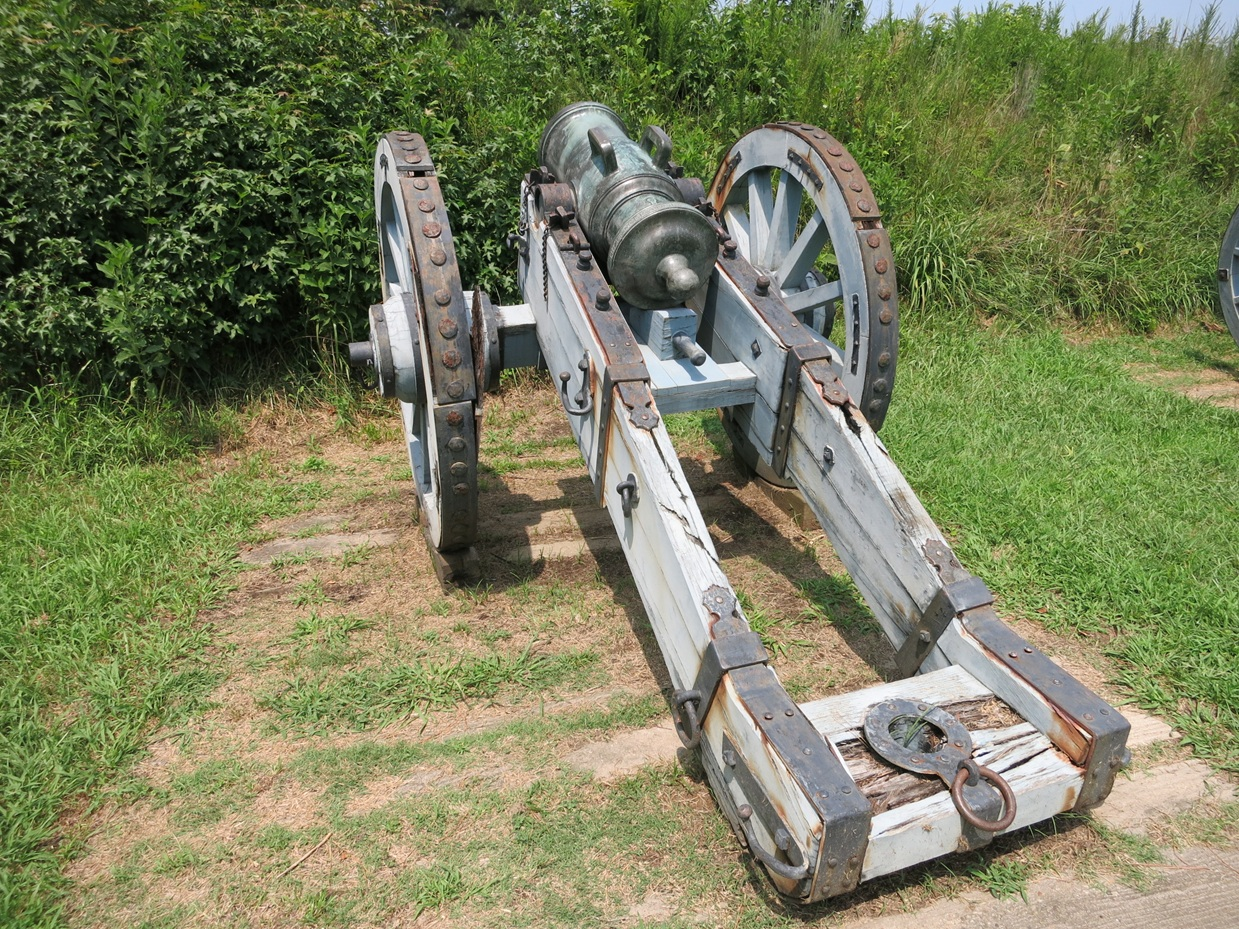
Vallière 8-pouce howitzer is located at Colonial National Historical Park in Yorktown, Va.

Another shortcoming that appeared during the war was the Vallière system's lack of a howitzer. When army officers demanded a howitzer, they were initially opposed by Vallière's son Joseph-Florent de Vallière (1717–1776) who became commander of the artillery school in 1747. Joseph de Vallière finally designed an 8-inch howitzer in 1749, but only a few were produced. A further problem with the Vallière system was that the gun carriages, as well as limbers and caissons were not standardized. Instead, each arsenal designed artillery vehicles to their own specifications.

During the Seven Years' War (1756–1763) in which mobility was a key factor, lighter field guns were clearly in need. The French artillery found itself at a significant disadvantage when facing Prussian and British cannons. The Vallière system's heavy field guns were outmatched when facing the much lighter Prussian field artillery and were also obsolete when compared to Austria's newly adopted Liechtenstein artillery system. In 1757, one Swedish 4-pounder was assigned to each infantry battalion. In 1758, 100 improved Swedish 4-pounders were ordered and the following year the Duke of Belle-Isle directed that two should be assigned to each infantry battalion.

In 1759, Marshal Duke Victor de Broglie ordered the re-boring of some Vallière cannons. The 8-pounders were re-bored as 12-pounders and the 12-pounders were re-bored as 16-pounders. In 1760, Jean Maritz the younger cast new 8-pounders, 12-pounders, 16-pounders, and 24-pounders to the Vallière design but without the ornate decoration on the gun barrels. In 1762, Maritz cast some significantly lighter 8-pounders that weighed 590 kg (1,301 lb) and 12-pounders that weighed 890 kg (1,962 lb).

=== Use in America ===
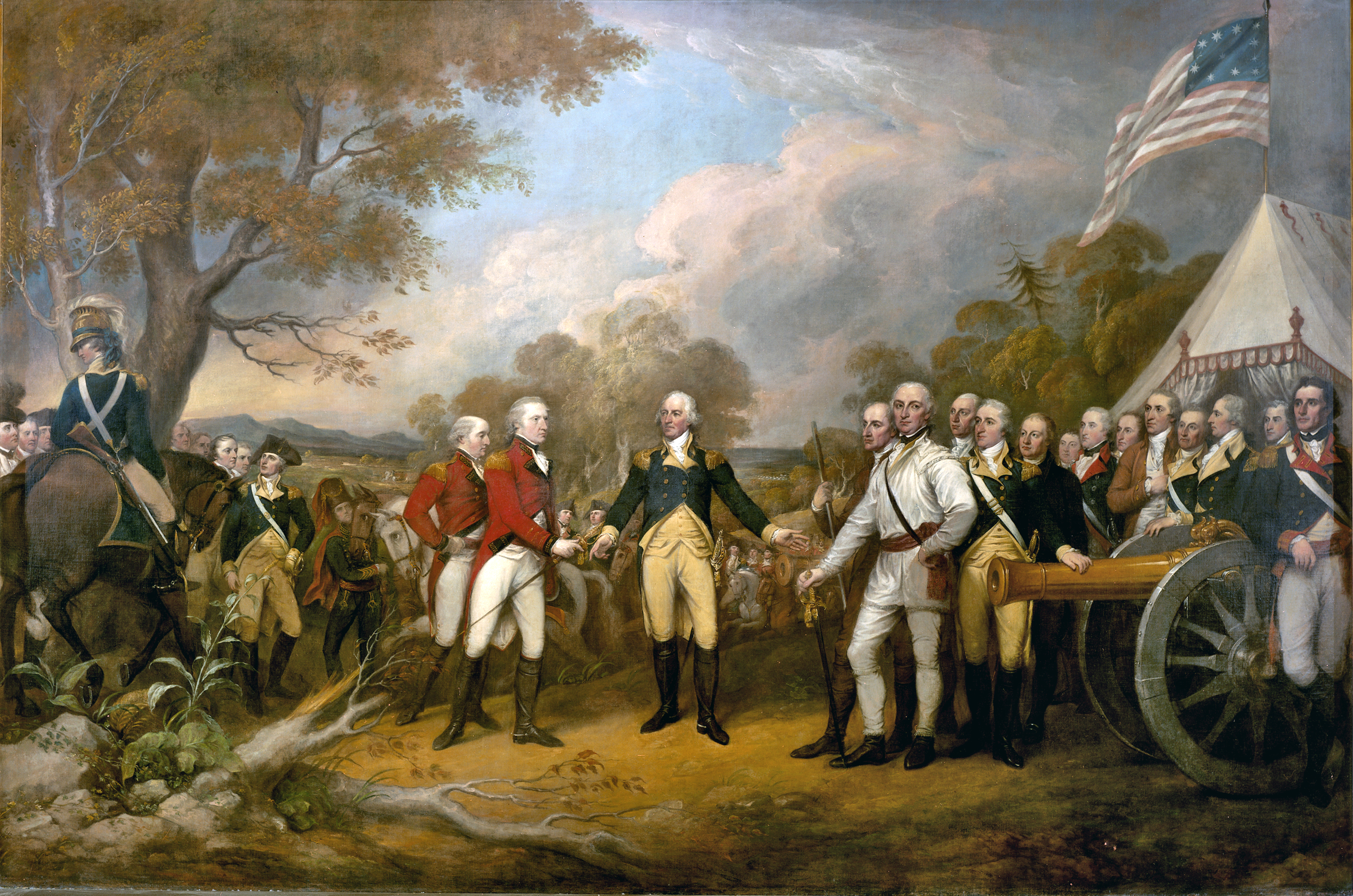
The surrender at Saratoga painting shows Daniel Morgan, in white, standing next to a Vallière 4-pounder.

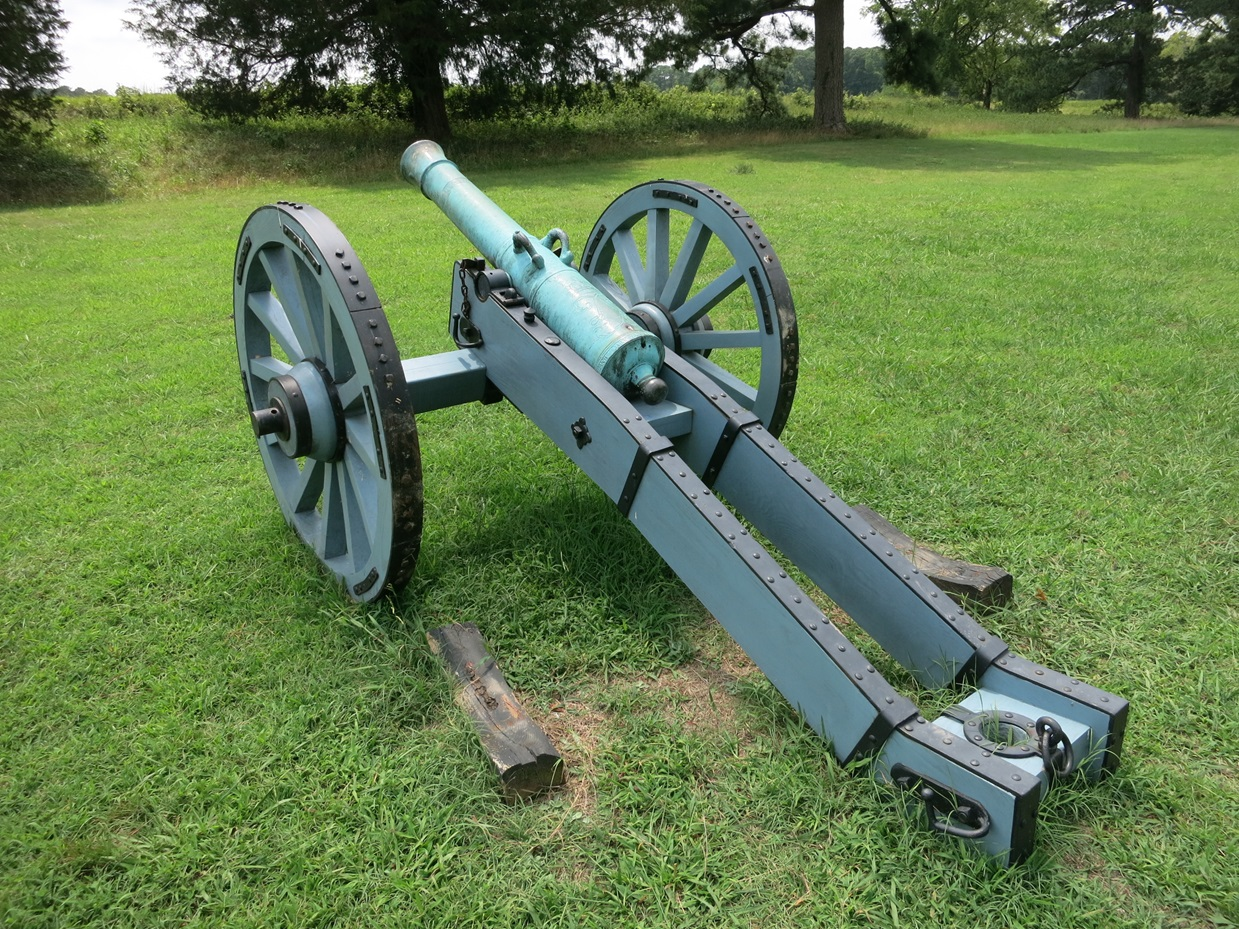
French-made Swedish 4-pounder gun Le Renard is located at the Colonial National Historical Park in Yorktown, Virginia.

Vallière guns were employed by the Thirteen Colonies during the American War of Independence. Before France's official entry into the war, Hortalez and Company, a fictitious firm began shipping the obsolete 4-pounder Vallière cannons and other military equipment to the colonies. The guns played an important role in the Battle of Saratoga in 1777. The Americans re-bored most of the over-engineered Vallière 4-pounders to accommodate standard British 6-pounder round shot. This was not the first time this had been done. In 1762, the Prussian army re-bored captured Vallière 4-pounders to take 6-pounder shot.

George Washington wrote about the guns in a letter to General William Heath on 2 May 1777, as follows:

"I was this morning favored with yours containing the pleasing accounts of the late arrivals at Portsmouth and Boston. That of the French ships of war, with artillery and other military stores, is most valuable. It is my intent to have all the arms that were not immediately wanted by the Eastern States, to be removed to Springfield, as a much safer place than Portsmouth ... I shall also write Congress and press the immediate removal of the artillery, and other military stores from Portsmouth. I would also have you forward the twenty-five chests of arms lately arrived from Martinico to Springfield."

Prior to the Siege of Yorktown, a French corps under the command of Jean-Baptiste Donatien de Vimeur, comte de Rochambeau marched together with American forces under Washington from the area near New York City to Williamsburg, Virginia. There the allies were joined by a second French corps under Claude-Anne de Rouvroy de Saint Simon which was landed from the French fleet under François Joseph Paul de Grasse. While Rochambeau's corps was equipped with thirty Gribeauval guns, (Note: Rochambeau had eight 12-pounders, sixteen 4-pounders, and six 6-inch howitzers, all Gribeauval system guns.) Saint Simon's corps was armed with mostly Vallière guns. There were twelve 24-pounders, eight 16-pounders, seven 12-inch mortars, four 8-inch mortars, and two 8-inch howitzers. The only pieces of Saint Simon's that were not Vallière guns were eight Swedish 4-pounders and twelve Rostaing 1-pounders.

== Obsolescence ==
In 1761, King Louis XV's War Minister Étienne François de Choiseul, Duke of Choiseul sent Joseph de Vallière to the Kingdom of Spain in 1761 at the request of King Charles III of Spain. From 1763, Jean-Baptiste Vaquette de Gribeauval, as Inspector General of the French Artillery, and second in rank to Joseph de Vallière, started efforts to introduce a more modern artillery system. Tests conducted at Strasbourg in 1765 proved that the ranges achieved by the lighter Gribeauval guns were comparable to those of the much heavier Vallière guns. Unlike the Vallière guns, the smaller caliber Gribeauval guns were true field artillery pieces. (See table below.)

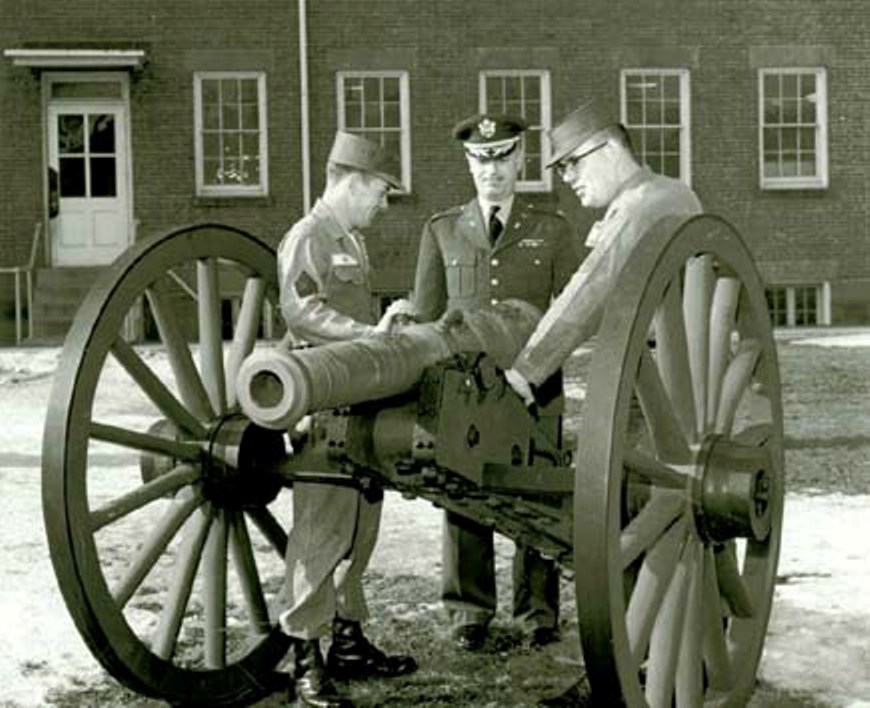
1960s US Army personnel are standing with a Vallière 4-pounder mounted on a 20-pounder Parrott rifle carriage.

Characteristics: Vallière system vs. Gribeauval system artillery pieces (Note: Vallière weights and lengths are from Summerfield, p. 36. Gribeauval weights and lengths are from Kiley, p. 565. All shot weights are from Kiley, pp. 564–565.)
System	Caliber	Tube Weight	Tube Length	Shot Weight
Vallière	4-pounder	522 kg (1,151 lb)	2.19 m (7.2 ft)	2 kg (4.4 lb)
Vallière	8-pounder	1,028 kg (2,266 lb)	2.64 m (8.7 ft)	4 kg (8.8 lb)
Vallière	12-pounder	1,565 kg (3,450 lb)	2.93 m (9.6 ft)	6 kg (13.2 lb)
Vallière	16-pounder	2,054 kg (4,528 lb)	3.10 m (10.2 ft)	8 kg (17.6 lb)
Vallière	24-pounder	2,645 kg (5,831 lb)	3.23 m (10.6 ft)	12 kg (26.5 lb)
Gribeauval	4-pounder	290 kg (639 lb)	1.57 m (5.2 ft)	2 kg (4.4 lb)
Gribeauval	8-pounder	580 kg (1,279 lb)	2.00 m (6.6 ft)	4 kg (8.8 lb)
Gribeauval	12-pounder	880 kg (1,940 lb)	2.29 m (7.5 ft)	6 kg (13.2 lb)
Gribeauval	16-pounder	2,000 kg (4,409 lb)	3.36 m (11.0 ft)	8 kg (17.6 lb)
Gribeauval	24-pounder	2,740 kg (6,041 lb)	3.53 m (11.6 ft)	12 kg (26.5 lb)

On 15 October 1765, based on the results of the Strasbourg tests, Choiseul and King Louis XV authorized the Gribeauval artillery system to take effect. This was done secretly in order to hide it from both foreign agents and reactionary French officers who might oppose the change. The Gribeauval system's field artillery included 4-pounder, 8-pounder, and 12-pounder guns as well as a 6-inch howitzer and a 1-pounder Rostaing gun.

When Joseph de Vallière returned to France in 1764, he discovered to his chagrin that he was no longer Director-General of Artillery. He tried to stop the implementation of the Gribeauval system but was blocked as long as Choiseul was in power. However, Choiseul was replaced as War Minister in December 1770. By this date, 1,200 of the new Gribeauval guns had been manufactured and equipped with gun carriages and caissons. After intense lobbying, Joseph de Vallière was reappointed Director-General of Artillery in 1772, bringing back the obsolete Vallière system. At this time, the Vallière 16-pounders and 24-pounders were still being used as siege guns. Since the cost to recast the existing Gribeauval guns would have been exorbitant, this was not done. On 3 October 1774, at the insistence of a panel of Marshals including the Duke of Broglie, the Marquis of Contades, the Duke of Richelieu, and the Prince of Soubise, the Gribeauval system was reinstated. This would give France one of the strongest artilleries of the early 19th century.

== Notes ==
Footnotes

Citations
