= Rindr =

Norse mythical character

Rindr (Old Norse, sometimes Anglicized Rind) is a goddess in Norse mythology. In Old Norse sources, she is the mother of Odin's son Váli.

In Saxo Grammaticus's euhemerised account found in his Gesta Danorum, she is a human princess from the Ruthenians, a Slavic group. In Saxo's tale, she is mother of a son of Odin named Bous.

== Old Norse sources ==
Drawing from earlier traditional material, the Prose Edda section Gylfaginning says that Rindr is mother of Odin's son Váli and is one of the ásynjur (goddesses).

Rindr's encounter with Odin is referenced in stanza 3 of Sigurðardrápa, a skaldic poem by Kormákr Ögmundarson praising Sigurðr Hlaðajarl, who ruled around Trondheim in the mid-10th century. Kormákr’s verse contains the statement, seið Yggr til Rindar (Yggr [Óðinn]? enchanted Rindr), using the verb síða. No further details are provided.

Rindr's name occurs in several skaldic verses and in the eddic poem "Baldrs draumar", where alliteration suggests it may originally have been *Vrindr; the etymology remains uncertain but there may be a connection with the Swedish placename Vrinnevi or Vrinnevid, near Norrköping. Rani is also mentioned in verse 6 of the eddic poem "Grógaldr": þann gól Rindi Rani (that [charm] Rani chanted to Rindr).

== Gesta Danorum ==
In the 12th century, Danish historian Saxo Grammaticus authored a euhemerised account of Odin and Rind in book III of his Gesta Danorum. There, Rindr is a human princess named Rinda and is the daughter of the King of the Ruthenians. After Balderus's death, Othinus consulted seers on how to get revenge.

On their advice, Othinus went to the Ruthenians disguised as a warrior called Roster. There, he was twice turned down by Rinda. He then wrote runes on a piece of bark and touched her with it, causing her to go mad, and disguised himself as a medicine woman called Wecha, who was allowed to see her. She finally fell ill; the disguised Othinus then said he had medicine with which to cure her, but that it would cause a violent reaction. On Othinus' advice, the king tied Rinda to her bed and Othinus proceeded to rape her. From the rape was born Bous, who would later avenge Balderus.
