= Veiled =

Veiled may refer to:

- Veiled, to wear a veil
- Veiled, a novel by Benedict Jacka
- Veiled, 2009 short film with Kristof Konrad, Beth Littleford, Leyna Weber
- Veiled (album), 1996 album by Leah Andreone
- "Veiled", a song by Mat Maneri from Trinity
