= Vail (surname) =

Vail is an English surname. Notable people with the surname include:

- Aaron Vail (1796–1878), American diplomat
- Alfred Vail (1807–1859), American machinist and inventor
- Anna Murray Vail 1863–1955), American botanist and first librarian of the New York Botanical Garden
- Aramenta Dianthe Vail (1820–1888), American painter
- Benjamin A. Vail (1844–1924), American jurist and politician
- Bob Vail (1881–1942), American baseball pitcher
- Calvin Lee Vail (born 1995), American YouTuber known as LeafyIsHere
- Charles H. Vail (1866–1924), American Universalist clergyman, Christian socialist, political activist, and writer
- Clover Vail (born 1939), Swiss-born American artist
- Edwin Arnold Vail (1817–1885), Canadian physician and political figure
- Eric Vail (born 1953), Canadian ice hockey player
- Fred Vail (fl. 1903–1914), American sports coach
- George Vail (1809–1875), American politician
- Harry Vail (died 1928), American rowing coach
- Henry Vail (1782–1853), American politician
- Ira Vail (1893–1979), American race car driver
- Louis Vail (fl. 1894), American football coach
- Lester Vail (1899 – 1959), American actor of the stage, screen, and radio
- Melville Vail (1906–1983), Canadian ice hockey player
- Mike Vail (born 1951), American baseball player
- Myrtle Vail (also as Myrtle Damerel; 1888–1978), American actress and writer
- Nathan R. Vail (1825–1888), American mine operator, landowner, and politician
- Jacob G. Vail (1827–1884), American army officer and general after the American Civil War
- Patrick Roger Vail (1859–1913), American businessman and politician
- Pegeen Vail Guggenheim (1925–1967), Swiss-French painter
- Peter Vail (1930–2024), American geologist and geophysicist
- Pyotr Vail (Пётр Львович Вайль; 1949–2009) Latvian-Russian writer, editor, and radio executive
- Rachel Vail (born 1966), American children and young adults genre author
- Richard B. Vail (1895–1955), American politician
- Silas Jones Vail (1818–1883), American hatmaker and hymn composer
- Stephen Vail (1780–1864), American rail and metal forge businessman
- Theodore Newton Vail (1845–1920), American telephony industrialist
- Theresa Vail (born 1990), American beauty pageant contestant ("Miss Kansas" 2013)
- Thomas Hubbard Vail (1821–1889), American Episcopalian bishop
- Tobi Vail (born 1969), American musician, music critic, and feminist activist; formerly of the band Bikini Kill
- Walter Vail (1852–1906), American businessman
- William Berrian Vail (1823–1904), Canadian businessman and politician
