= Váli =

Norse deity, son of Odin

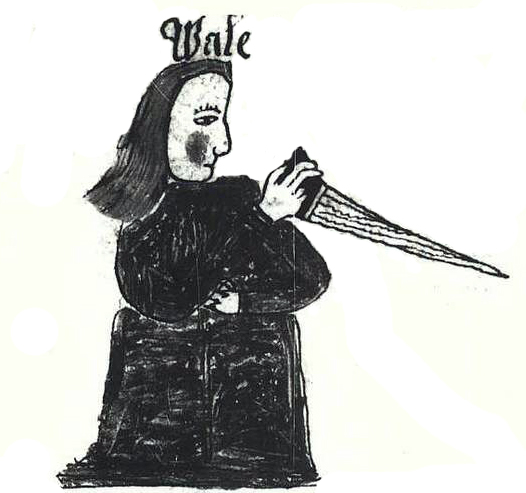
An illustration of the Norse god Váli, from a late 17th century Icelandic manuscript

In Norse mythology, Váli (Old Norse) or Boe or Bous (Latin) is a god and the son of the god Odin and Rindr (who is either a goddess herself or a human princess, depending on the sources). Váli has numerous brothers including Thor, Baldr, and Víðarr. He was born for the sole purpose of avenging Baldr, and does this by killing Höðr, who was an unwitting participant, and binding Loki with the entrails of his son Narfi. Váli grew to full adulthood within one day of his birth, and slew Höðr before going on to Loki. He is prophesied to survive Ragnarök.

== Attestations ==
=== Icelandic sources ===
The Váli myth is referred to in Baldrs draumar:

Rindr will bear Váli
in western halls;
that son of Óðinn
will kill when one night old –
he will not wash hand,
nor comb head,
before he bears to the pyre
Baldr's adversary.
— translation by Ursula Dronke

In Völuspá:

There formed from that stem,
which was slender-seeming,
a shaft of anguish, perilous:
Hǫðr started shooting.
A brother of Baldr
was born quickly:
he started – Óðinn's son –
slaying, at one night old.

He was thought of as a great archer and a courageous fighter on the battlefield. The Prose Edda (Gylfaginning) describes him:

One is called Ali or Váli, son of Odin and Rindr: He is daring in fights, and a most fortunate marksman.

In stanza 51 of Vafthrúdnismál, Vafþrúðnir states that he will survive Ragnarök, along with his brother Víðarr and the sons of Thor, Móði and Magni:

Stanza 51:
"In the gods' home Vithar | and Vali shall dwell,
When the fires of Surt have sunk;
Mothi and Magni | shall Mjollnir have
When Vingnir falls in fight."

=== Danish sources ===
Gesta Danorum by Saxo Grammaticus is a 12th century euhemerised account in Latin of the history of the kings of Denmark, but draws on other mythological stories and presents them in a historical context (i.e. presenting gods as human figures from the past). In this story, after the death of Balder at the hands of Hother (the human king of Denmark and Sweden), Odin (a human sorcerer who was believed to be a god) enchants Rinda (a human princess of the Ruthenians) and fathers Boe or Bous on her. This crime leads Odin to be exiled by the other gods for nearly 10 years. When he returns, he seeks out Boe and encourages him to take revenge on Hother. Hother, foreseeing that he will die in the battle, passes the kingship on to his son Rorik. Hother meets Boe in battle and is killed, but Boe also dies of his wounds a day later. The Ruthenian army held a funeral for him and buried him in a barrow.

The Annales Ryenses, a 13th century Latin chronicle that used Gesta Danorum as a source, briefly relates a similar story. In this version, the figure is known as Boyo, but he is not explicitly a son of Odin. Instead, Odin (as "Othen") is presented as a legendary king of Denmark, who died in Athens (as "Othens") and was succeeded by Balder. Balder was then killed and succeeded by Hothær. Boyo, described as a king of Sweden, then kills Hothær and becomes king of Denmark. Boyo leaves the throne of Denmark to his son Rørik (described in Gesta Danorum as Hother's son instead).

== Parentage ==
Early mistranslation or confusion has led to a single mention of a Váli who is a son of Loki: "Þá váru teknir synir Loka, Váli ok Nari eða Narfi" from the Prose Edda, translated as "Then were taken Loki's sons, Váli and Nari". We find the original of the only reference to Váli as the son of Loki, while even the same text refers to Baldr's death being avenged by his brother (in Völuspá 33) as well as Váli being the Son of Odin in Völuspá 51, which is repeated in Baldr's draumar.

In the late period Gesta Danorum we also see that Odin is said to have a son with Rinda that will avenge his other son, Baldr's, death – though in this case the name of this new son is Boe rather than Váli. In all these tales Odin goes out immediately – either through seduction, deception, or force – to sire this son. (Note: Note that an avenging son would not have been needed if Odin's goal had been only the destruction of the blind and defenseless Höðr.)

Similarly where each of these documents ascribe Váli the role of Loki's son we see only in the postscript or translation notes that this transformation was a punishment when in fact the gift of wolf's strength and rage is well attested as being granted by Odin to warriors known as ulfhednar, which would make his son Váli a Berserker and a possible origin for the ulfhednar legend.

Finally we see a different description in Hauksbók. In this version of Völuspá, stanza 34 begins: "Þá kná Vála | vígbǫnd snúa", usually amended to the nominative Váli in order to provide a subject for the verb; Ursula Dronke translates it as "Then did Váli | slaughter bonds twist" which presumably refers to Váli, son of Óðinn, who was begotten to avenge Baldr's death, and thus it is likely that he bound Loki, while it is highly improbable that it refers to a Váli, son of Loki, who is attested nowhere but one line of the Prose Edda. (Note: The Prose Edda itself confirms the existence of Váli son of Odin and avenger of Baldr in two locations.)
