= List of muzzle-loading guns =

Muzzle-loading guns (as opposed to muzzle-loading mortars and howitzers) are an early type of artillery, (often field artillery, but naval artillery and siege artillery were other types of muzzleloading artillery), used before, and even for some time after, breech-loading cannon became common. Projectile (early on with shot and then later on with shells) and powder charge are loaded via the muzzle and rammed down the barrel, and then fired at the target. Muzzle-loading artillery came in smoothbore and rifled form, the rifled guns increasingly taking over from the smoothbores as time past and technology improved. Most were made of bronze because of a lack of metallurgic technology, but cast and wrought-iron guns were common as well, particularly later on. Muzzleloading artillery evolved across a wide range of styles, beginning with the bombard, and evolving into culverins, falconets, sakers, demi-cannon, rifled muzzle-loaders, Parrott rifles, and many other styles. Handcannons are excepted from this list because they are hand-held and typically of small caliber.

== Smoothbore muzzle-loading cannon ==
Caliber (mm)	Weapon name	Country of origin	Design
40	Hwangja-Chongtong	Korea	Early 15th century
50	Galloper gun	United Kingdom	1740
61	Hyunja-Chongtong	Korea	Early 15th century
76	Grasshopper cannon	United Kingdom	18th century
76	Minion	United Kingdom	18th century
83	Saker	United Kingdom	18th century
84	Swedish 4-pounder cannon	Sweden	1725
84	Canon de 4 de Vallière	Kingdom of France	1732
84	Swedish 4-pounder cannon	Kingdom of France	1740
84	Canon de 4 Gribeauval	Kingdom of France	1765
84	So-po	Korea	Late 19th century
93	M1841 6-pounder field gun	United States	1841
93–96	6-pounder smoothbore cannon	various	1716
96	Canon de 6 système An XI	France	1803
100	Demi-culverin	United Kingdom	18th century
100	Hongyi-po	Dutch Republic	Early 17th century
100	Canon de 8 de Vallière	Kingdom of France	1732
100	Canon de 8 Gribeauval	Kingdom of France	1765
105	Jija-Chongtong	Korea	Early 15th century
117	M1841 12-pounder howitzer	United States	1841
117	M1841 mountain howitzer	United States	1841
117	M1857 12-pounder Napoleon	United States	1857
118	Cheonja-Chongtong	Korea	Early 15th century
120	Jung-po	Korea	Late 19th century
121	Canon de 12 livres Le Solide	Kingdom of France	1688
121	Canon de 12 de Vallière	Kingdom of France	1732
121	Canon de 12 Gribeauval	Kingdom of France	1765
121	Canon obusier de 12	France	1853
130	Culverin	United Kingdom	18th century
134	Canon de 16 Le Combattant	Kingdom of France	1674
134	Canon de 16 La Curiosité	Kingdom of France	1679
148	M1841 24-pounder howitzer	United States	1841
151	Canon de 16 Le Protecteur	Kingdom of France	1683
151	Obusier de 15 cm Valée	France	1828
154	Demi-cannon	United Kingdom	18th century
155	Canon de 24 de Vallière	Kingdom of France	1732
162	Obusier de 6 pouces Gribeauval	Kingdom of France	1765
163	M1844 32-pounder howitzer	United States	1844
178	Ornate Ottoman cannon	Ottoman Empire	1581
204	ML 8-inch shell gun	United Kingdom	1820s
206	68-pounder gun	United Kingdom	1846
217	Obusier de 8 Vallière	Kingdom of France	1773

== Rifled muzzle-loading cannon ==
Caliber (mm)	Weapon name	Country of origin	Design
64	RML 2.5-inch mountain gun	United Kingdom	1879
73	10-pounder Parrott rifle	United States	1861
76	3-inch Ordnance rifle	United States	1861
76	RML 7-pounder mountain gun	United Kingdom	1873
86	Canon de campagne de 4 rayé	France	1858
93	20-pounder Parrott rifle	United States	1861
96	Wiard rifle	United States	1861
97	14-pounder James rifle	United States	1861
121	Canon de 12 La Hitte	France	1859
140	70-pounder Whitworth naval gun	United Kingdom	1860s
160	RML 64-pounder 64 cwt gun	United Kingdom	1865
160	RML 64-pounder 71 cwt gun	United Kingdom	1870
160	RML 6.3-inch howitzer	United Kingdom	1878
178	RML 7-inch gun	United Kingdom	1860s-1890s
191	Widow Blakely	Confederate States of America	1861
203	RML 8-inch gun	United Kingdom	1866
206	68-pounder Lancaster gun	United Kingdom	1850s
227	RML 9-inch 12-ton gun	United Kingdom	1865
233	Somerset cannon	United Kingdom	1863
254	RML 10-inch 18-ton gun	United Kingdom	1868
279	RML 11-inch 25-ton gun	United Kingdom	1867
305	RML 12-inch 25-ton gun	United Kingdom	1866
305	RML 12-inch 35-ton gun	United Kingdom	1873
318	RML 12.5-inch 38-ton gun	United Kingdom	1875
406	RML 16-inch 80-ton gun	United Kingdom	1880
450	RML 17.72-inch gun	United Kingdom	1877

== See also ==
- Artillery
- Bombard
- Cannon
- Culverin

== Bibliography ==
- Olmstead, Edwin; Stark, Wayne E. & Tucker, Spencer C. (1997). The Big Guns: Civil War Siege, Seacoast, and Naval Cannon. Alexandria Bay, New York: Museum Restoration Service. ISBN 0-88855-012-X.
