= Battle of Flint Creek =

1789 battle

- Part of Chickamauga Wars
Date	January 10, 1789
Location	Near present-day Flag Pond, Tennessee, Unicoi County, Tennessee
Result	Franklinite militia victory

Belligerents
State of Franklin militia	Chickamauga Cherokee and Creek warriors

Commanders and leaders
John Sevier	John Watts

Strength
Franklin forces: Unknown number of mounted troops, rangers, and infantry	Chickamauga forces: Unknown

Casualties and losses
5 killed; 16 wounded	145 killed and buried; additional wounded

The Battle of Flint Creek was a January 10, 1789 frontier battle fought near Flint Creek at the base of Flint Mountain in what is now Unicoi County, Tennessee. The engagement occurred during a series of conflicts and often violent warfare taking place along the southern Appalachian frontier involving Cherokee resistance factions and frontier settlements now referred to as the Chickamauga Wars, The battle is primarily documented through an after-action report by militia leader John Sevier, and account of which was later printed in a 1789 issue of The Augusta Chronicle and Gazette of the State. Today, the battle is interpreted at the Flint Creek Battle Site within Lamar Alexander Rocky Fork State Park.

== Background ==
In the decades after the Treaty of Sycamore Shoals (1775) and the rapid growth of Euro-American settlement in the "Overmountain settlements" of the Holston, Watauga, and Nolichucky valleys, resistance to settlement coalesced among Cherokee leaders who opposed further land cessions. A militant faction commonly referred to as the Chickamauga formed around Dragging Canoe and allied communities, and it included not only Cherokees but also Creek warriors and other allies over time. The Chickamauga were a diverse coalition that attempted to limit or reverse white settlement for roughly two decades through raids and military-like campaigns.

By the late 1780s, political and military conditions on the frontier were complicated by the short-lived State of Franklin (an attempted extra-legal state formed by frontier leaders). John Sevier was widely known as a frontier military leader and the only governor of Franklin. He was a central figure in organizing militia responses to attacks on settlements.

A U.S. Army article on the battle describes a context of increasing violence in 1788 and notes that Cherokee political unity in that period was influenced by killings and retaliations along the frontier. The same account identifies Cherokee war leader John Watts as associated with the Chickamauga leadership cadre and describes Flint Creek as a winter base used to keep pressure on settlements during the cold season.

== Battle ==
=== Approach and plan ===
In a report dated January 12, 1789, Sevier wrote that he received intelligence that a “considerable body” of enemy forces was collecting near Flint Creek within roughly 25 miles of his headquarters and that he had marched immediately through heavy snow and extreme cold to strike the encampment.

Sevier reported that once his force was within about a mile of the camp, the militia located it by the smoke of campfires “...extended along the foot of the Apalachian Mountains...” He convened a council of officers and ordered a detachment under General McCarter, described as including “...Bloody Rangers and the Tomahawkmen...” to occupy the mountain pass that he believed would serve as the enemy's main route of retreat, while the remainder of his force formed along the front of the camp.

The U.S. Army analysis describes Sevier's scheme as a raid designed to isolate the camp by occupying high ground and then assaulting from the mouth of the draw. The article also notes Sevier brought a small “grasshopper” cannon that he used to initiate the attack.

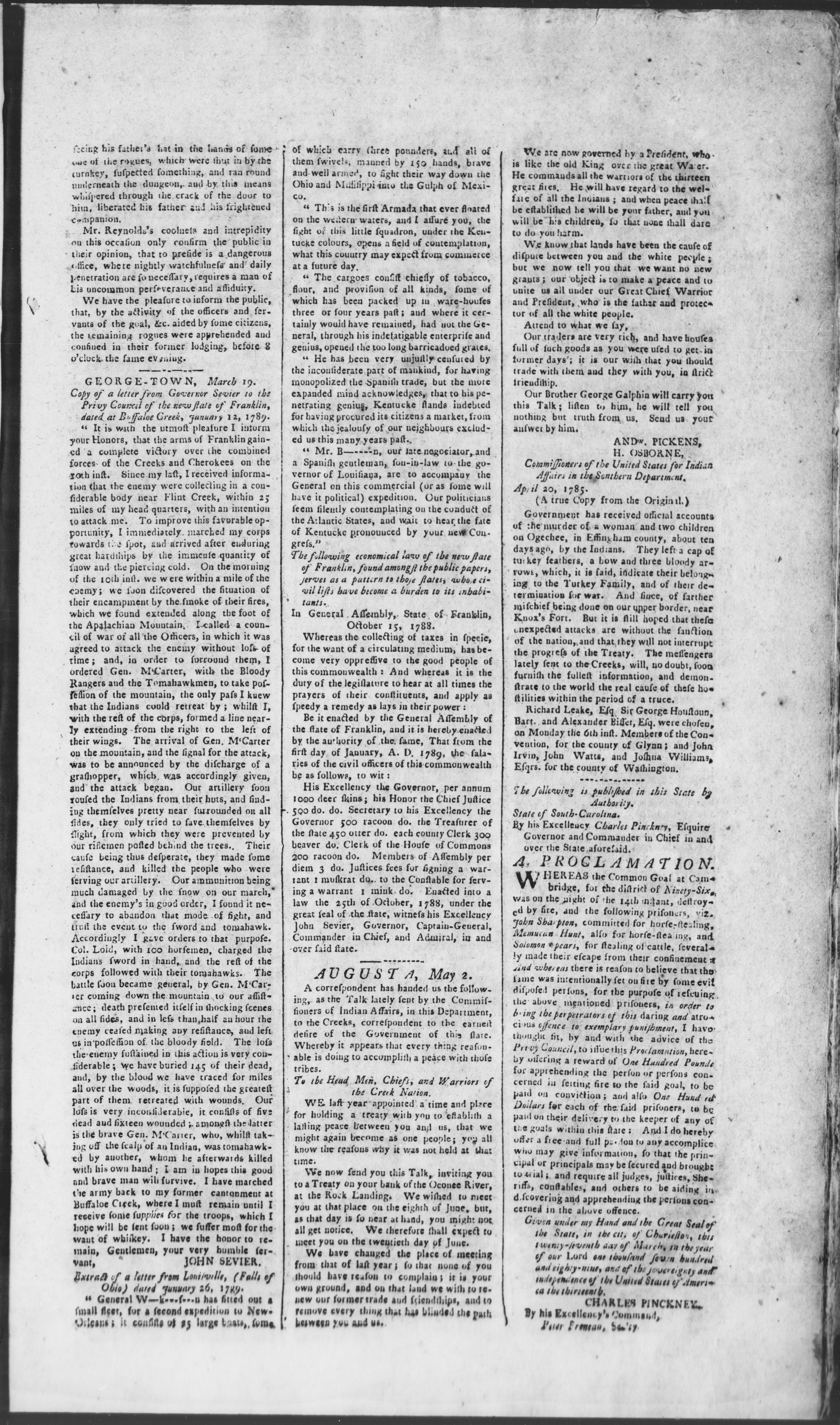
Newspaper page printing John Sevier's January 12, 1789 report of the Battle of Flint Creek (published May 2, 1789).

=== Fighting ===
According to Sevier's account, the signal to begin the assault was the discharge of the cannon. He wrote "...the artillery ... roused the Indians from their huts...” and the encamped force attempted to escape, but was checked by riflemen posted behind trees. Sevier stated the enemy fighters briefly rallied and killed the men servicing the artillery. Because the militia ammunition had been damaged by snow, and the enemy ammunition was in better condition, he shifted the assault from gunfire to close-quarters combat, commanding: "...to the sword and tomahawk."

Sevier reported that Colonel Laird led roughly 100 horsemen in a sword charge, followed by additional men using tomahawks, and that when McCarter's detachment descended from the mountain the fighting became general. Sevier stated the engagement ended with his militia holding the field. The U.S. Army article describes the engagement as a rapid clearance of the camp that concluded within thirty minutes.

== Casualties ==
Sevier reported that his force buried 145 of the enemy dead and inferred that additional wounded retreated into the woods "for miles...", evidenced by multiple blood trails. He reported militia losses as five dead and 16 wounded, including General McCarter, who was tomahawked while taking a scalp, but who then killed his attacker. The Army analysis repeats these figures and notes that, in the author's research, no Chickamauga account of the battle had survived for comparison.

== Aftermath ==
Sevier wrote that he marched back to his previous cantonment at Buffalo Creek and expected to remain there until receiving supplies, adding that his troops "...suffer most for the want of whiskey..." The battle has since been characterized as a major and lopsided militia victory that disrupted Chickamauga operational momentum gained in the 1788 campaign season.

== Battlefield site and documentation ==
The battle site is within Lamar Alexander Rocky Fork State Park (formerly Rocky Fork State Park), in Unicoi County, Tennessee. Tourism publications state the park received a Federal Recreational Trails grant (administered through the Tennessee Department of Environment and Conservation) to develop access and interpretive markers for the Flint Creek Battle Site.

The Tennessee Division of Archaeology has recorded the battleground as state archaeological site 40UC10. In 2015, a Tennessee Historic Preservation Fund listed a $12,000 grant for remote sensing at the battleground. In 2016, an additional $9,000 was granted for continued survey work there.

== Primary sources ==
The best-known contemporaneous description of the battle is Sevier's January 12, 1789 letter, printed in the Augusta Chronicle (May 2, 1789) and preserved in the Georgia Historic Newspapers digital archive.
