= Rocky Fork State Park =

Rocky Fork State Park may refer to:

- Rocky Fork State Park (Ohio)
- Rocky Fork State Park (Tennessee)
