= Lamar Alexander Rocky Fork State Park =

State park in Tennessee, United States

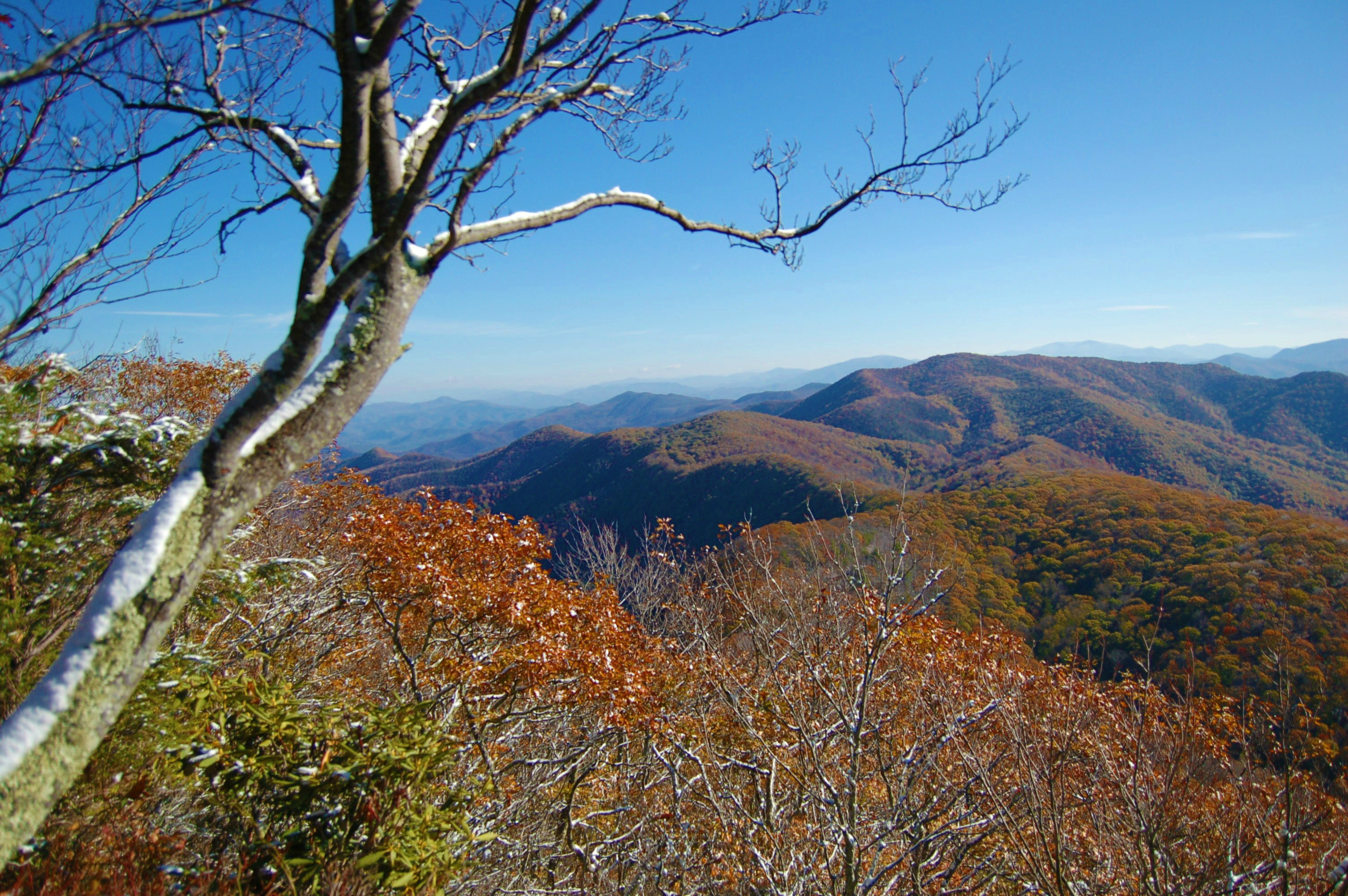
- View into Rocky Fork from Buzzard Rock.

- Location within Tennessee
- Type: Tennessee State Park
- Location: Flag Pond, Tennessee, US
- Nearest city: Erwin, Tennessee
- Coordinates: 36°03′03″N 82°34′16″W
- Area: 2,076 acres (8.40 km^{2})
- Operator: Tennessee Department of Environment and Conservation
- Open: Year-round
- Hiking trails: 10
- Website: Official website

Lamar Alexander Rocky Fork State Park (RFSP) is a state park spanning 2,076 acres (8.40 km^{2}) in Unicoi County, East Tennessee, near the community of Flag Pond and the Tennessee–North Carolina state line. The park forms the state-park component of the larger Rocky Fork conservation project, which protects the 10,000-acre Rocky Fork watershed alongside adjoining lands of the Cherokee National Forest. The park is part of the Appalachian Mountains and has access to the Appalachian Trail.

== History ==
=== Indigenous history ===
Human occupation in what is now Tennessee spans thousands of years. Archaeologists generally describe this deep history using broad cultural periods—Paleoindian, Archaic, Woodland, Mississippian, and later Protohistoric/Historic eras—which provide a shared framework for interpreting the archaeological record (for example, changes in stone tool technologies, settlement patterns, foodways, and the development of agriculture).

==== Cherokee presence and frontier-era treaties ====
By the eighteenth century, Cherokee communities (including the Overhill towns) were established in what is now eastern Tennessee. The region became a major zone of contact as Euro-American settlement expanded into the Watauga and Nolichucky valleys in the 1770s. Land claims and jurisdiction in what became Northeast Tennessee were repeatedly redefined through boundary-making agreements, land purchases, and treaties between Cherokee leaders, colonial governments, and (after independence) the United States.

==== Treaties and land cessions (1770–1791) ====
- 1770 – Treaty of Lochaber established a boundary line between the Cherokee and colonial Virginia that was used to govern settlement claims on the Holston frontier.
- 1771 – Following a survey, Cherokee leaders accepted a modification often associated with “Little Carpenter” that affected settlement legality north of the Holston River.
- 1775 – At Sycamore Shoals on the Watauga River, Richard Henderson negotiated the Transylvania Purchase with Cherokee leaders; associated negotiations also included supplemental Watauga and Nolichucky lease/purchase arrangements (often summarized as the “Watauga” and “Brown” purchases).
- 1777 – The Treaty of Long Island of the Holston (also called the “Avery Treaty”) was negotiated at Long Island on the Holston amid Revolutionary-era frontier violence and included cessions and boundary terms involving state authorities.
- 1785 – The Treaty of Hopewell established peace and a boundary framework between the United States and the Cherokee, but disputes and further cessions continued.
- 1791 – The Treaty of Holston (signed at Knoxville on July 2, 1791) set new boundaries and included Cherokee land cessions in exchange for a federal annuity.

==== Settlement, local governance, and frontier conflict (1772–1796) ====
In parallel with treaty-making, the Watauga Association (1772) functioned as an early form of frontier self-government. Washington County was created by North Carolina in 1777, initially encompassing a large area later subdivided into multiple counties. Settlement in the mountains of what became Unicoi County is commonly described as beginning in the late 1770s, with farms and churches developing along valley waterways.

During the 1780s the region was affected by the State of Franklin movement, reflecting disputes over governance in what is now East Tennessee. Frontier conflict involving Cherokee parties and militia responses continued into this period, including an engagement commonly known as the Battle of Flint Creek in 1789, which took place in present day park.

After Tennessee became a state in 1796, county-level reorganization continued; Carter County was created in 1796 from part of Washington County as population and administration expanded.

=== Formation of Unicoi County and development of the Erwin area ===
The county name “Unicoi” is derived from the Cherokee word, unega, meaning "white, hazy, or fog-draped," referring to the misty, low-lying clouds often seen in the Southern Appalachians.

Unicoi County was created by the Tennessee General Assembly on March 23, 1875, and the new county court took office on January 3, 1876. In the nineteenth century the community in the area of the modern county seat carried multiple names (including Unaka in 1832 and Longmire in 1840) before the later establishment of Erwin; a frequently repeated local account holds that a post office application intended to honor Capt. John Ervin was returned as “Erwin,” and the spelling was adopted in 1879.

=== Logging legacy and acquisition ===
Before becoming a state park, the Rocky Fork landscape was part of roughly 10,000 acres (40 km^{2}) of privately owned mountain tract on the Tennessee–North Carolina line, contiguous with major public holdings in the Cherokee National Forest and Pisgah National Forest and near the Sampson Mountain Wilderness. During the acquisition period it was described as the largest privately owned inholding within the southern National Forest System, and the tract was reported as owned by New Forestry, LLC and managed by Timbervest.

The tract’s present-day forest reflects a working-forest past. Much of the park is described as second-growth, and management planning identifies extensive hardwood cove forest along with hemlock-dominated stands that have been impacted by Hemlock woolly adelgid infestation. A network of historic timber access routes—old roads, grades, and firebreak corridors—remained across the property and later provided natural alignments for trail corridors and recreational access planning as the park developed.

Although privately owned, the area was not “closed land” for much of the twentieth century. The tract was leased for decades to Tennessee’s wildlife agency, and it was used by the public for hunting, fishing, and camping prior to permanent protection and state-park establishment. Its conservation importance was closely tied to the fact that the tract functioned as a single, largely uninterrupted watershed-scale block of forest connected to adjacent public lands, including coldwater trout streams and an Appalachian Trail segment that, at the time, lacked a protected right-of-way through the property.

In the 2000s, the tract was marketed for primary and second-home development, raising concerns about habitat fragmentation, watershed impacts, and long-term public access to the Appalachian Trail corridor and surrounding national forest lands. Acquisition proceeded in phases: a portion entered federal ownership in 2008, and additional appropriations and partner financing were used to complete transfer of remaining acreage into public ownership, including lands added to the Cherokee National Forest and the parcel that became the state park. SAHC reports that a $6 million Tennessee Heritage Conservation Trust Fund grant (awarded in 2007) supported acquisition of the acreage that became the state park, while more than $30 million in Land and Water Conservation Fund funding supported U.S. Forest Service acquisition of most of the adjoining watershed for the Cherokee National Forest through phased purchases (2008–2012).

=== Establishment, opening, and renaming ===
In October 2012, the park was designated as Tennessee’s 55th state park. Early efforts prioritized trail maintenance, basic parking improvements, and ecological preservation without permanent facilities, as the site lacked visitor amenities at inception. Park staff, assigned starting in 2015, operated from rented office space to oversee these activities amid ongoing planning for expanded access. The park officially opened to the public in May 2015.

In January 2019, Governor Bill Haslam renamed it Lamar Alexander Rocky Fork State Park in honor of former U.S. Senator Lamar Alexander. In announcing the change, the state cited Alexander’s role in securing federal funding for the public acquisition of the larger Rocky Fork tract, stating that beginning in 2006 he helped secure more than $30 million to purchase the tract and add it to the Cherokee National Forest.

Alexander represented Tennessee in the U.S. Senate from 2003 to 2021 and previously served as Governor of Tennessee (1979–1987) and U.S. Secretary of Education (1991–1993). He also supported the federal Great American Outdoors Act (signed in 2020), which permanently authorized $900 million per year for the Land and Water Conservation Fund and created the National Parks and Public Land Legacy Restoration Fund with deposits of up to $1.9 billion annually for five years (FY2021–FY2025).

== Planning and development debate ==
In late 2018, Tennessee State Parks presented a development concept that included a visitor center and a new two-lane access road to a scenic overlook and campground. Media coverage described the proposed road as approximately 0.75 miles (1.21 km) long and 24 feet (7.3 m) wide, with steep grades that would require substantial cuts and retaining walls in rugged terrain. The proposal drew criticism from conservation advocates who argued that large-scale road construction could increase erosion and sediment runoff into Rocky Fork Creek and would alter the park’s intentionally primitive character.

Opponents also raised site-specific ecological concerns, including the placement of facilities near wet areas used by species such as synchronous and “blue ghost” fireflies and the star-nosed mole, and urged the state to evaluate alternative locations and development approaches. A commentary published in Blue Ridge Outdoors reported that public comments submitted during the period it reviewed were overwhelmingly opposed to the plans presented.

Park planning and construction continued in subsequent years. In the park’s 2025 strategic management plan update, staff noted that the park had remained in a “design and construction” phase for several years, citing prior state funding for a visitor center and related facilities and ongoing efforts to expand trailhead parking and add permanent restrooms. State Building Commission minutes from June 2025 describe the “Rocky Fork State Park Visitor Center” project scope as including a visitor center, maintenance building, picnic shelter, driveway, pedestrian bridge, road access, and utility infrastructure, and record a revised project budget to award a base-bid construction contract.

== Recreation ==
The park’s trail inventory totals 19.16 miles, including an Appalachian Trail access route, overlooks, waterfalls, trout-fishing access, rock climbing, biking, hunting, backcountry camping, and interpretive programs.

Trout-fishing is permitted on park streams (including Rocky Fork and Flint Creek), which are managed under Tennessee Wildlife Resources Agency “wild trout stream” special regulations.

Backcountry camping is available at three primitive campsites located along the trail network.

Rock climbing is permitted at Whitehouse Cliffs (and, as of 2024, at Black Stacks) under a registration system and site-specific restrictions intended to protect sensitive cliff-top vegetation (including no cliff-top access and helmet requirements).

The park also offers interpretive programs and improving accessibility (e.g., low-grade trails and all-terrain wheelchair rental).

== Geology and landscape ==
Lamar Alexander Rocky Fork State Park lies in the Blue Ridge physiographic province in the Unaka Mountains. The park forms part of the ~10,000 acres (40 km^{2}) Rocky Fork watershed, which includes the 2,076 acres (8.40 km^{2}) state park and roughly 8,000 acres (32 km^{2}) of adjoining Cherokee National Forest land. The tract is characterized by steep, forested ridges and narrow stream valleys drained by Rocky Fork Creek and tributaries including Flint Creek, South Indian Creek, and many unnamed others; Rocky Fork Creek flows through the park and continues downstream to the Nolichucky River.

Regionally, the Blue Ridge of northeastern Tennessee exposes very old crystalline basement rocks (notably gneiss and granite) and thick metasedimentary successions assigned to the Ocoee Supergroup (a Late Proterozoic–early Paleozoic package of detrital, graywacke-type rocks), overlain locally by Lower Cambrian clastic strata of the Chilhowee Group. In nearby parts of Unicoi County, U.S. Geological Survey mapping describes the basal Chilhowee sequence (including the Unicoi, Hampton, and Erwin formations) as quartzite- and sandstone-rich units with intervening shale and siltstone, deformed by northeast-trending folds and thrust faults typical of the Blue Ridge. Resistant quartzite contributes to prominent cliffs and knobs; the park’s Whitehouse Cliffs are described as a white quartzite escarpment used for technical rock climbing, and the Whitehouse Cliffs Trail climbs nearly 900 ft (270 m) to a ridge-top viewpoint on Whitehouse Knob (about 3,400 ft (1,000 m)) with broad views across the Blue Ridge.

== Ecology ==
Lamar Alexander Rocky Fork State Park protects part of the Rocky Fork watershed in the Unaka Mountains and forms the core of a larger ~10,000-acre conservation block adjoining the Cherokee National Forest.

=== Ecosystems and habitats ===
A 2025 state strategic-management update identifies the park’s principal natural resources as extensive hardwood cove forest and associated headwater/riparian systems, including about 1,500 acres of hardwood cove forest, ~8 miles of riparian corridor, ~400 acres of hemlock forest, and ~8 miles of high-quality freestone creeks; public use is generally concentrated on trails and stream corridors. Streams in the park are managed for trout fishing under Tennessee Wildlife Resources Agency “wild trout stream” special regulations.

Cove forests in the southern Blue Ridge occur on sheltered, moist slopes and coves and are characterized by closed canopies of moisture-loving trees; “rich” coves typically support a lush herb layer, while more acidic coves often have dense ericaceous shrub understories (e.g., rhododendron). Appalachian cove hardwood forests are among the most species-rich temperate ecosystems outside the tropics and support high densities of mammals, birds, and endemic salamanders. Exceptional cove forests in the southern Appalachians have also been described as exhibiting temperate-rainforest characteristics, reflecting persistent cool, humid microclimates in protected coves and stream valleys.

=== Flora ===
A botanical survey of the 3,800-hectare Rocky Fork Tract documented 749 vascular plant species; about 15% were non-native, and uncommon/rare taxa were especially concentrated in sedge (Cyperaceae) and orchid (Orchidaceae) groups. The same survey reported 19 species on Tennessee’s rare plant list and 34 on the Cherokee National Forest Species Viability List. Tennessee State Parks has additionally characterized Rocky Fork as having the second-highest number of rare/endangered plant species in the state park system. In addition to cove hardwood and riparian communities, the tract includes a heath bald dominated by Catawba rhododendron (Rhododendron catawbiense) with abundant turkeybeard (Xerophyllum asphodeloides). Hemlock-dominated stands are affected by the hemlock woolly adelgid (HWA), and the park’s management plan emphasizes chemical treatment and biocontrol efforts aimed at maintaining hemlock cover along stream and trail corridors.

In Tennessee, HWA management options include chemical treatment (commonly soil injection or soil drench using imidacloprid or dinotefuran) and biological control via releases of predatory beetles such as Laricobius.

=== Fauna ===
The broader Rocky Fork conservation lands have been described as prime habitat for black bear, white-tailed deer, wild turkey, and other wildlife, and the tract lies within the Unicoi Bear Sanctuary and an Audubon-designated Important Bird Area. Streams in the watershed support native brook trout and other coldwater fauna, and have been highlighted for the extent of protected “blue ribbon” trout waters within the larger Rocky Fork tract. Reported species of conservation interest documented on the property include peregrine falcon, eastern hellbender, Yonahlossee salamander, woodland jumping mouse, star-nosed mole, and smoky shrew.

== Extirpated and extinct species ==
Several animal species formerly native to the Southern Appalachian region of northeastern Tennessee are now extirpated (locally eliminated) or extinct (globally lost), reflecting both historical landscape change and deeper-time faunal turnover recorded in regional fossil sites.

=== Historic extirpations and reintroductions ===
- American bison (Bison bison) formerly occurred in Tennessee, but disappeared from the Appalachian portion of East Tennessee before 1800 and was believed absent statewide by 1823. A National Park Service summary of historical “terminal dates” for bison east of the Mississippi likewise gives Tennessee’s extirpation as 1823.
- Elk (Cervus canadensis / Cervus elaphus complex) were extirpated from Tennessee by the mid-19th century; the Tennessee Wildlife Resources Agency (TWRA) cites the last historical record as an elk killed in 1865 in Obion County. TWRA also notes the subspecies once present in Tennessee (Cervus elaphus canadensis, as historically classified) is extinct, and that a different subspecies was used for modern releases beginning in 2000.
- Red wolves (Canis rufus) historically occurred across the southeastern United States, including Tennessee, before regional extirpation. Under a federal recovery effort, red wolves were reintroduced to Great Smoky Mountains National Park in North Carolina and Tennessee, but the U.S. Fish & Wildlife Service and National Park Service terminated the project in 1998 due to very low pup survival and failure to establish home ranges within the park.

=== Range expansions (20th century to present) ===
- Coyotes (Canis latrans) were not known in Tennessee prior to the 20th century; a TWRA extension handout reports that coyotes expanded eastward through Tennessee in the 1960s and early 1970s and were well established by the mid-1970s in counties west of the Tennessee River, with continuing spread into Middle and East Tennessee. A continent-scale synthesis similarly describes coyote expansion beginning around 1900, with forest fragmentation and extirpation of larger predators likely facilitating spread into forested eastern regions.

=== Globally extinct birds once present in the region ===
- The passenger pigeon (Ectopistes migratorius)—formerly extremely abundant in eastern North America—went extinct rapidly under commercial exploitation; one widely cited summary reports extinction in the wild by the end of the 19th century and the death of the last captive bird (“Martha”) on September 1, 1914, at the Cincinnati Zoo. TWRA’s State Wildlife Action Plan highlights the passenger pigeon as an example of a species that “disappeared from America.”
- The Carolina parakeet (Conuropsis carolinensis) declined steeply in the late 19th century and became extinct in the wild early in the 20th century; an Encyclopedia of North Carolina entry notes later reports of sightings from Tennessee and states the final captive specimen died at the Cincinnati Zoo on February 21, 1918.

=== Paleontological record (deep-time fauna) ===
Northeastern Tennessee also preserves a much older record of extinct species through fossil sites in the region. The Gray Fossil Site (near Gray, Tennessee) represents a forested sinkhole-pond ecosystem dating to roughly 4.5–5 million years ago (Early Pliocene), with fossils of ~200 plant and animal species including tapirs, rhinoceroses, alligators, and proboscideans (including “mastodons” in popular summaries). Separate from the Pliocene record, Tennessee also has late Ice Age (Pleistocene) fossils of large mammals such as mastodons, documented by finds within the state and displayed by the Tennessee State Museum.

== Climate ==
The park sits on the windward slopes of the southern Appalachian Mountains, where elevation and rugged terrain create cooler conditions and enhance precipitation relative to nearby valleys. At the nearest long-term observing site (NOAA station “Erwin 1 W”, elevation 1,720 ft), mean annual precipitation for the 1991–2020 climate normal period is 47.00 inches, with precipitation occurring on about 137.5 days per year (≥0.01 in). Precipitation is distributed year-round, with a summer maximum driven largely by convection and frequent thunderstorms (June–August averaging about 4.76–5.51 inches per month), while autumn is typically drier (October averaging 2.54 inches). Snowfall at Erwin averages 9.3 inches annually, concentrated in mid-winter (January–February).

Across Tennessee, precipitation increases toward the higher southern Appalachian terrain due to orographic uplift; gridded PRISM normals show the wettest totals in the Blue Ridge/Unaka highlands compared with the interior lowlands. Regional climatology summaries similarly note that the mountainous far east is the state’s wettest area, with the highest elevations locally exceeding ~75 inches per year in some mountain zones.

Wind conditions are strongly shaped by complex terrain, with channeling along valleys and enhanced exposure on ridges; studies of the adjacent Great Valley emphasize topographic controls on local wind regimes in eastern Tennessee.

Climate data for Erwin, Tennessee (near Rocky Fork; 1991–2020 climate normals)
Month	Jan	Feb	Mar	Apr	May	Jun	Jul	Aug	Sep	Oct	Nov	Dec	Year
Mean daily maximum °F (°C)	47.3 (8.5)	50.8 (10.4)	58.7 (14.8)	68.4 (20.2)	76.2 (24.6)	82.8 (28.2)	85.4 (29.7)	84.9 (29.4)	80.2 (26.8)	70.8 (21.6)	58.9 (14.9)	50.3 (10.2)	67.8 (19.9)
Mean daily minimum °F (°C)	24.5 (−4.2)	26.9 (−2.8)	33.0 (0.6)	40.7 (4.8)	49.8 (9.9)	58.1 (14.5)	62.2 (16.8)	61.1 (16.2)	55.0 (12.8)	43.0 (6.1)	32.5 (0.3)	28.0 (−2.2)	42.9 (6.1)
Average precipitation inches (mm)	3.46 (88)	3.27 (83)	3.82 (97)	3.99 (101)	4.83 (123)	5.07 (129)	5.51 (140)	4.76 (121)	3.28 (83)	2.54 (65)	2.83 (72)	3.64 (92)	47.00 (1,194)
Average snowfall inches (cm)	3.40 (8.6)	2.50 (6.4)	0.90 (2.3)	0.00 (0.00)	0.00 (0.00)	0.00 (0.00)	0.00 (0.00)	0.00 (0.00)	0.00 (0.00)	0.00 (0.00)	0.10 (0.25)	2.40 (6.1)	9.3 (24)

== Flint Creek Battle Site ==
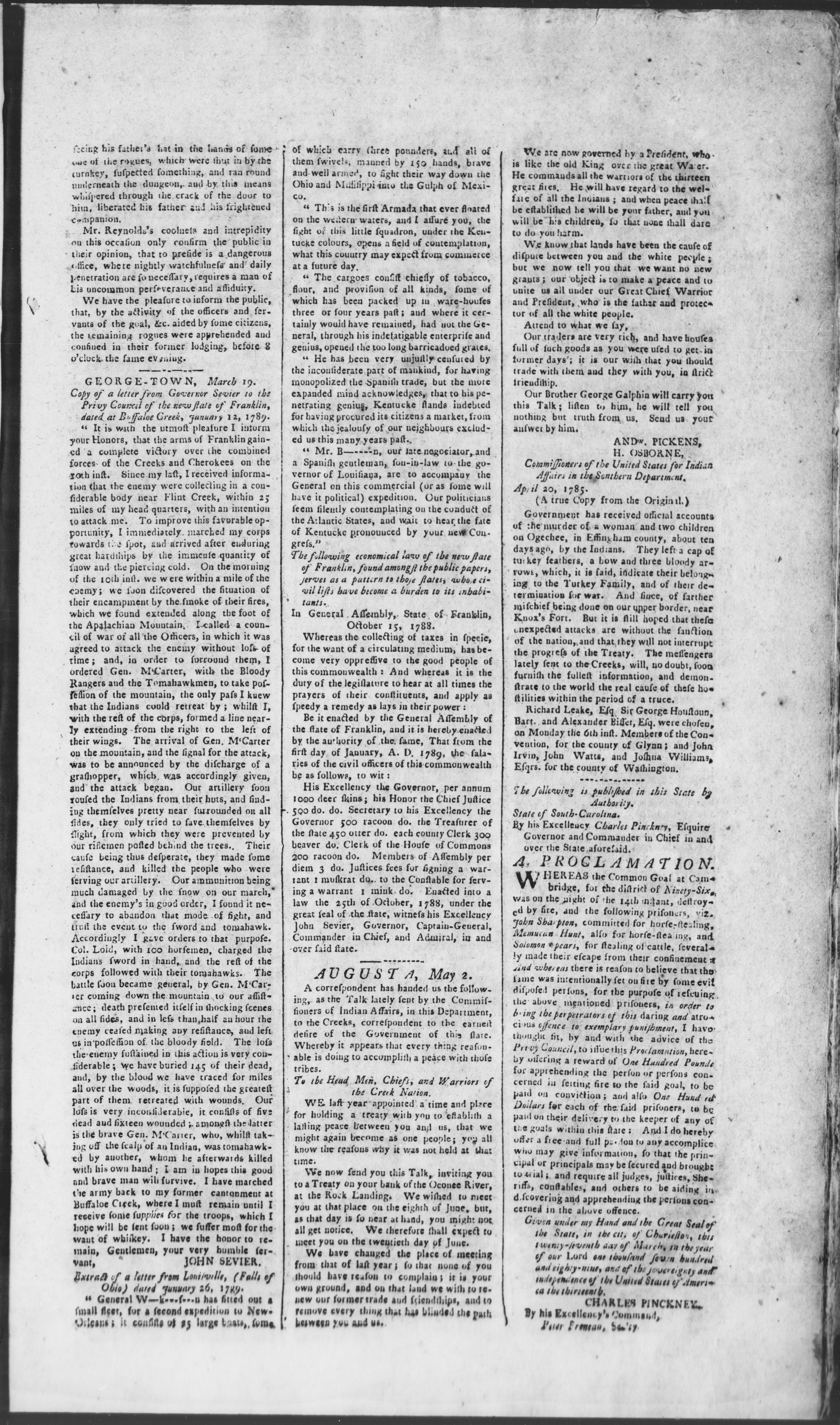
Newspaper page printing John Sevier’s January 12, 1789 report of the Battle of Flint Creek (published May 2, 1789).

The park contains the Flint Creek Battle Site, associated with the Battle of Flint Creek, a frontier engagement in the conflicts often grouped under the Cherokee–American wars (also called the Chickamauga Wars). The battle occurred on January 10, 1789, where a militia under John Sevier defeated a faction of the Chickamauga Cherokee at the base of Flint Mountain.

Contemporary documentation of the battle is largely based on Sevier’s after-action report, dated January 12, 1789 and later printed in The Augusta Chronicle and Gazette of the State (May 2, 1789). In that letter, Sevier reported that his force buried 145 of the opposing force’s dead and suffered five killed and sixteen wounded, while noting that additional wounded were believed to have escaped based on blood trails through the woods. A later professional analysis published by the U.S. Army (Infantry) describes the fight as a rapid raid that relied on surprise and isolation of escape routes and characterizes it as a major and lopsided militia victory within the Chickamauga Wars.

In the 2010s, the park received a Federal Recreational Trails $188,600 grant administered through the Tennessee Department of Environment and Conservation to improve access to the battlefield area and to develop interpretive markers for the site; the same account notes plans for a bridge over Rocky Fork Creek to facilitate visitor access to the Flint Creek battlefield area.

== Nearby state parks ==
The following state parks are near Rocky Fork State Park:

- Sycamore Shoals State Historic Park - 32.2 miles (52 km)
- David Crockett Birthplace State Park - 33.2 miles (53 km)
- Roan Mountain State Park - 40.9 miles (66 km)
- Mount Mitchell State Park (North Carolina) - 68.4 miles (110 km)
