= Grasshopper cannon =

18th-19th century British light field gun

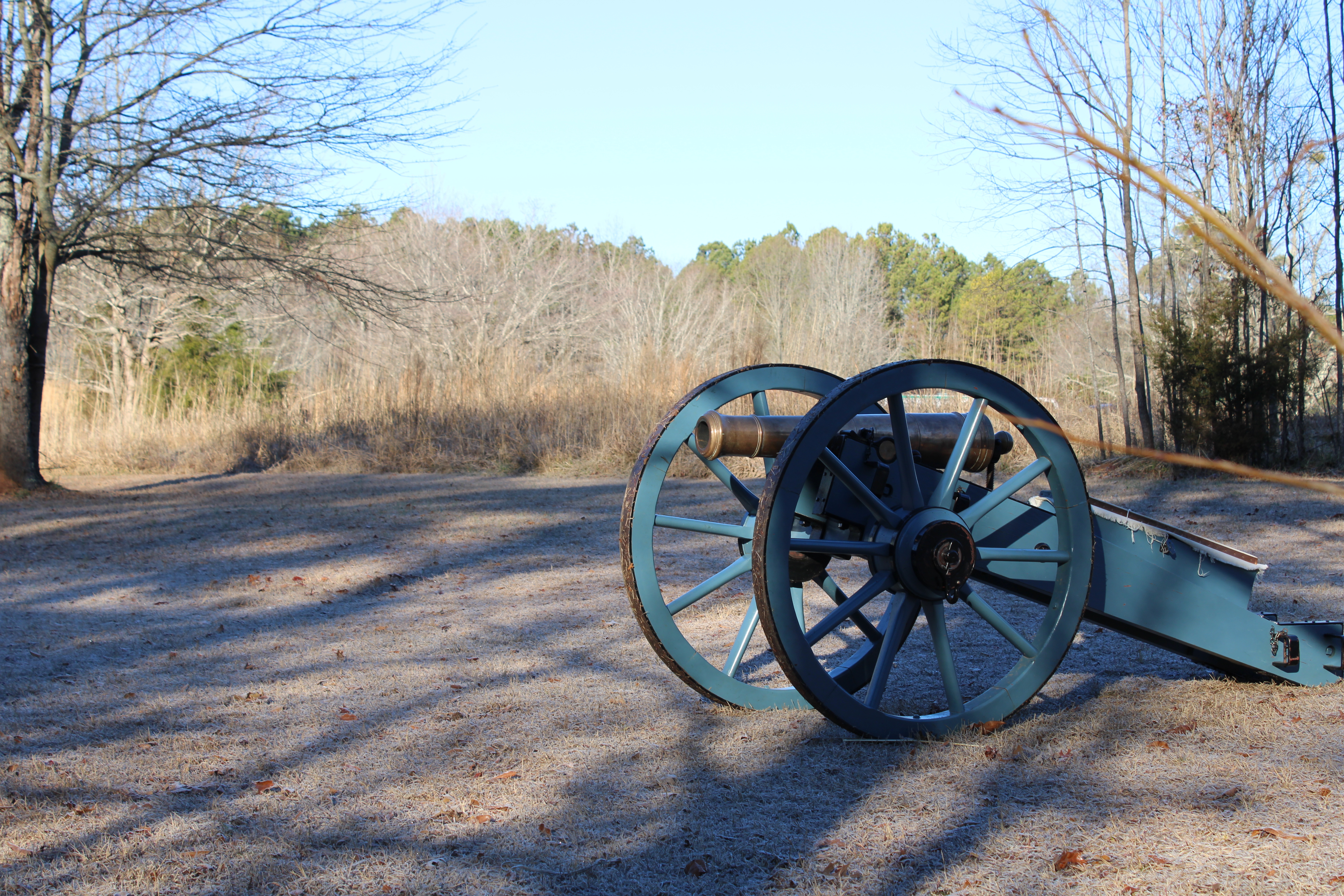
- Reproduction three-pounder "grasshopper" cannon at Cowpens National Battlefield
- Type: Field gun (light battalion gun)
- Place of origin: Kingdom of Great Britain

Service history
- In service: c. 1770s–early 19th century
- Used by: Kingdom of Great Britain; Sultanate of Mysore
- Wars: War of the Regulation; American Revolutionary War; War of 1812

Production history
- Designed: late 18th century
- Manufacturer: Royal Arsenal (Woolwich) and contractors
- Produced: late 18th century

Specifications
- Mass: c. 200 lb (c. 90 kg) (barrel; varies by pattern)
- Barrel length: c. 37 in (c. 94 cm) (barrel; varies by pattern)
- Shell: Round shot; grapeshot; canister shot
- Caliber: 3-pounder (firing a ~3 lb / 1.4 kg Round shot)
- Carriage: Bracket/Split trail carriage with detachable shafts (manhandled by crew) or towed by a limber
- Effective firing range: c. 400–800 yd (c. 370–730 m) (varies with elevation and charge)

A grasshopper cannon was a British bronze 3-pounder light field gun used as a battalion gun to support infantry in the late 18th and early 19th centuries, particularly in North America. The nickname is associated with the gun’s light-carriage system and/or its lively motion when fired, and was used informally rather than as an official designation.

== Design ==
=== Barrel and materials ===
Grasshopper guns were commonly described in contemporary usage as "brass" guns, but were typically cast in bronze (a copper–tin alloy). The higher strength of bronze allowed thinner construction than comparable iron guns and, in the event of a catastrophic failure, a bronze piece was more likely to split rather than shatter.

=== Carriage and mobility ===
The weapon was intended to be highly mobile for close infantry support. In British service in North America, light 3-pounders were moved by their crews using ropes and wooden shafts in a handcart-like manner, and could also be towed when fitted to a limber system. One documented set of informal terms distinguished a 3-pounder pulled by a limber ("butterfly") from a configuration in which shafts attached directly to the carriage ("grasshopper"); the nicknames were discouraged in official returns.

== Ammunition and performance ==
The gun fired a 3-pound (about 1.4 kg) solid iron ball and could also fire anti-personnel ammunition such as grape or canister, with ammunition often prepared as fixed cartridges (powder charge attached to the projectile) for rapid loading. A well-drilled crew could maintain a relatively high rate of fire for a field piece in this class.

== Service history ==
=== War of the Regulation ===
In 1771 at the Battle of Alamance, William Tryon and his men had 2, 3 pounder grasshopper cannons as well as several swivel guns. Their use proved decisive in the battle and the regulators were routed. This was the first major armed rebellion against the British since Bacon's Rebellion.

=== American Revolutionary War ===
Light British 3-pounders were employed as battalion guns in the American Revolutionary War. At the Battle of Cowpens (1781), two British light 3-pounder "grasshopper" cannons accompanied Tarleton’s force and were captured near the end of the action. At the Battle of Guilford Courthouse (1781), British 3-pounder "grasshopper" cannons provided covering fire as the British advanced into contact.

=== Frontier warfare (Chickamauga Wars) ===
A light "grasshopper" cannon was used on the southern Appalachian frontier during the Chickamauga Wars. In the Battle of Flint Creek (January 10, 1789), John Sevier initiated the attack with the discharge of a grasshopper cannon, but reported that the defenders of the encampment "killed the people who were serving our artillery." Sevier also wrote that militia ammunition had been "much damaged by the snow" during the march through heavy snow and extreme cold, prompting him to abandon prolonged gunfire and shift to close combat.

=== War of 1812 ===
Verbruggen-pattern 3-pounders remained in use into the War of 1812 in British and provincial service in Canada, including documented employment in operations along the Niagara and St. Lawrence corridors. At the Battle of Queenston Heights (1812), provincial artillery units were equipped with 3-pounders described in contemporary/near-contemporary accounts as "grasshopper" artillery.

== Surviving examples ==
Surviving British bronze 3-pounders of Verbruggen-related patterns are held in multiple museum collections in North America, including examples identified as Townshend- and Congreve-pattern guns.

== See also ==
- American Revolutionary War
- War of 1812
- Artillery
- Battalion gun
- Leather cannon
