= Flag Pond, Tennessee =

Unincorporated community in Tennessee, US

Coordinates: 36°00′55″N 82°33′26″W

Flag Pond is an unincorporated community in Unicoi County, Tennessee. It is part of the Johnson City Metropolitan Statistical Area, which is a component of the Johnson City-Kingsport-Bristol, TN-VA Combined Statistical Area – commonly known as the Appalachian Highlands region.

== Name ==
The community's name is believed to be derived from the presence of "flag flowers" (wild iris) growing in wet areas at the edge of a local pond.

== Postal service ==
Flag Pond is the location of a post office, assigned ZIP code 37657.

== Recreation ==
Flag Pond is the location of the Lamar Alexander Rocky Fork State Park.

== Transportation ==
Flag Pond is located along Old Asheville Highway the former route of US 23. The community can accessed via Interstate 26/US 23 exits 43, 46 and 50.
