= Jean-Jacques Keller =

Swiss gunfounder (1635–1700)

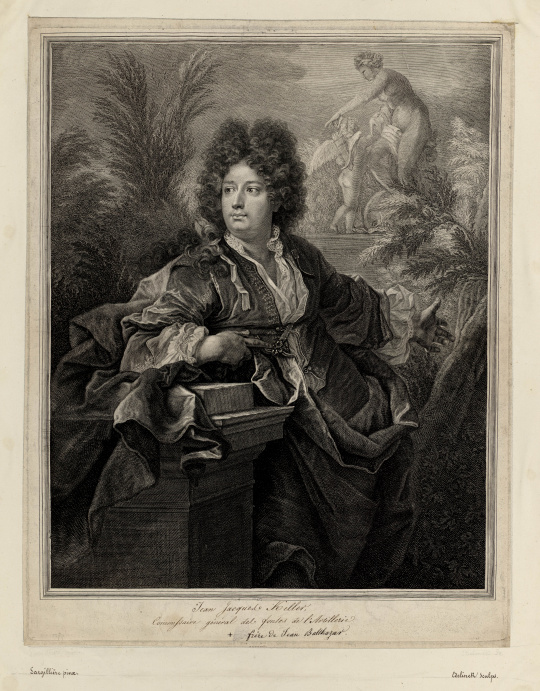

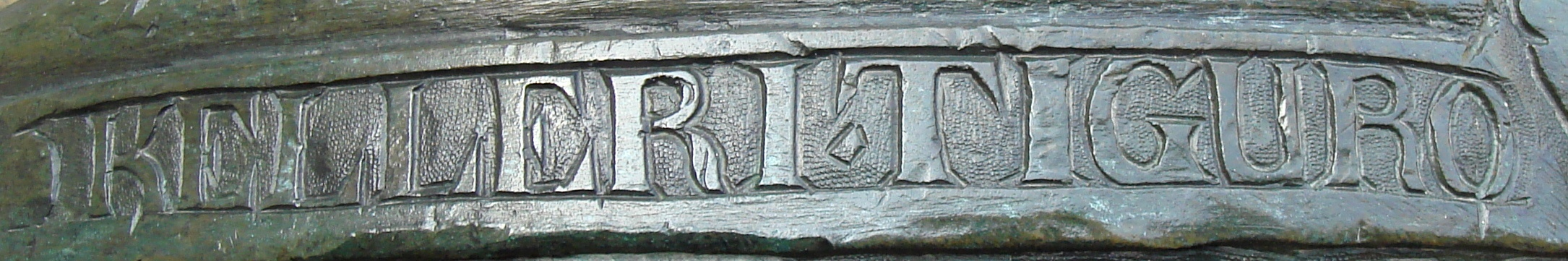
Signature of Jean-Jacques Keller on 1683 cannon Le Protecteur: "Kelleri Tiguro" (i.e. "Keller the Tigurini", of the Tigurini people of the Zürich region).

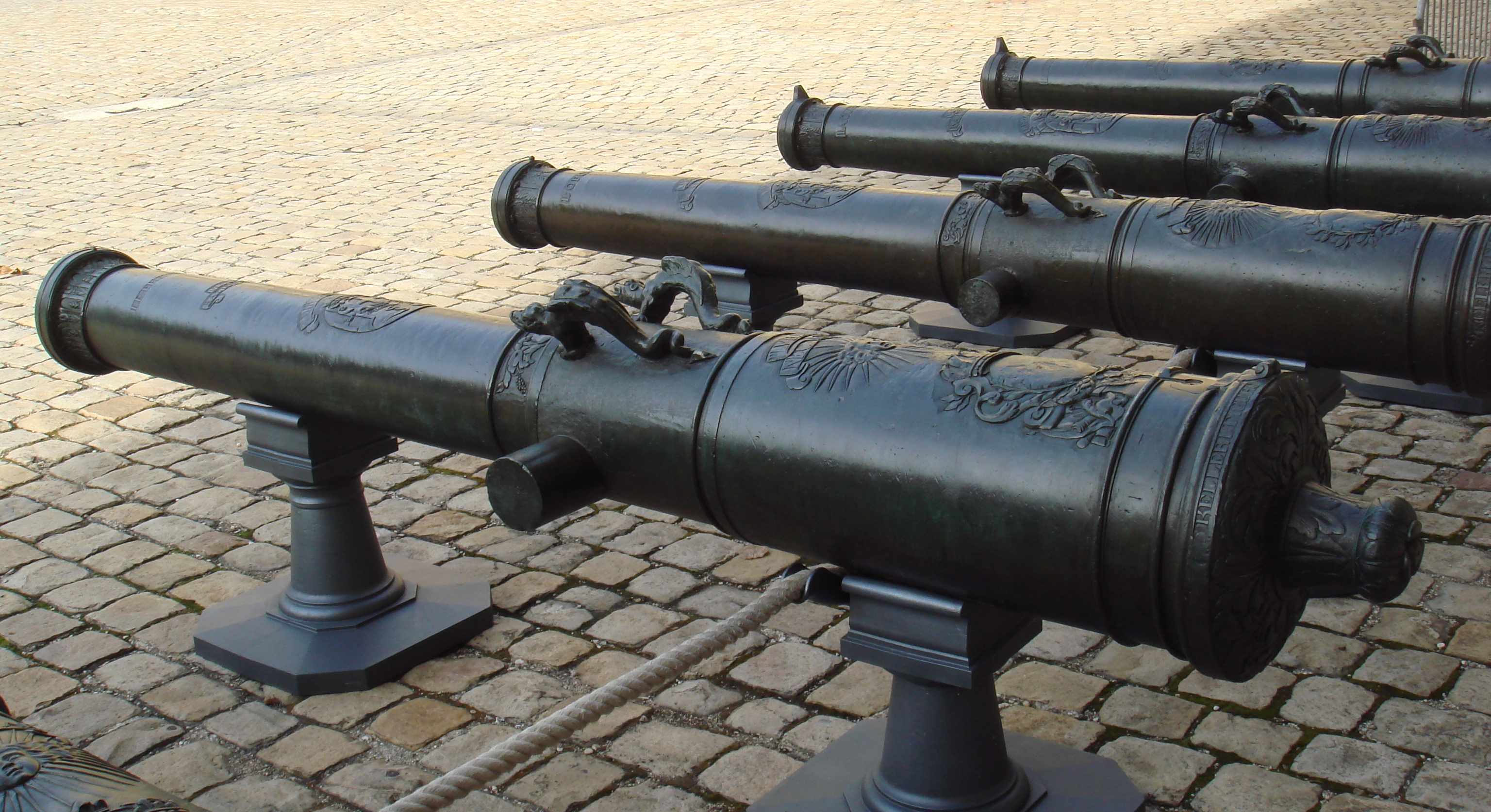
Keller cannons, Les Invalides.

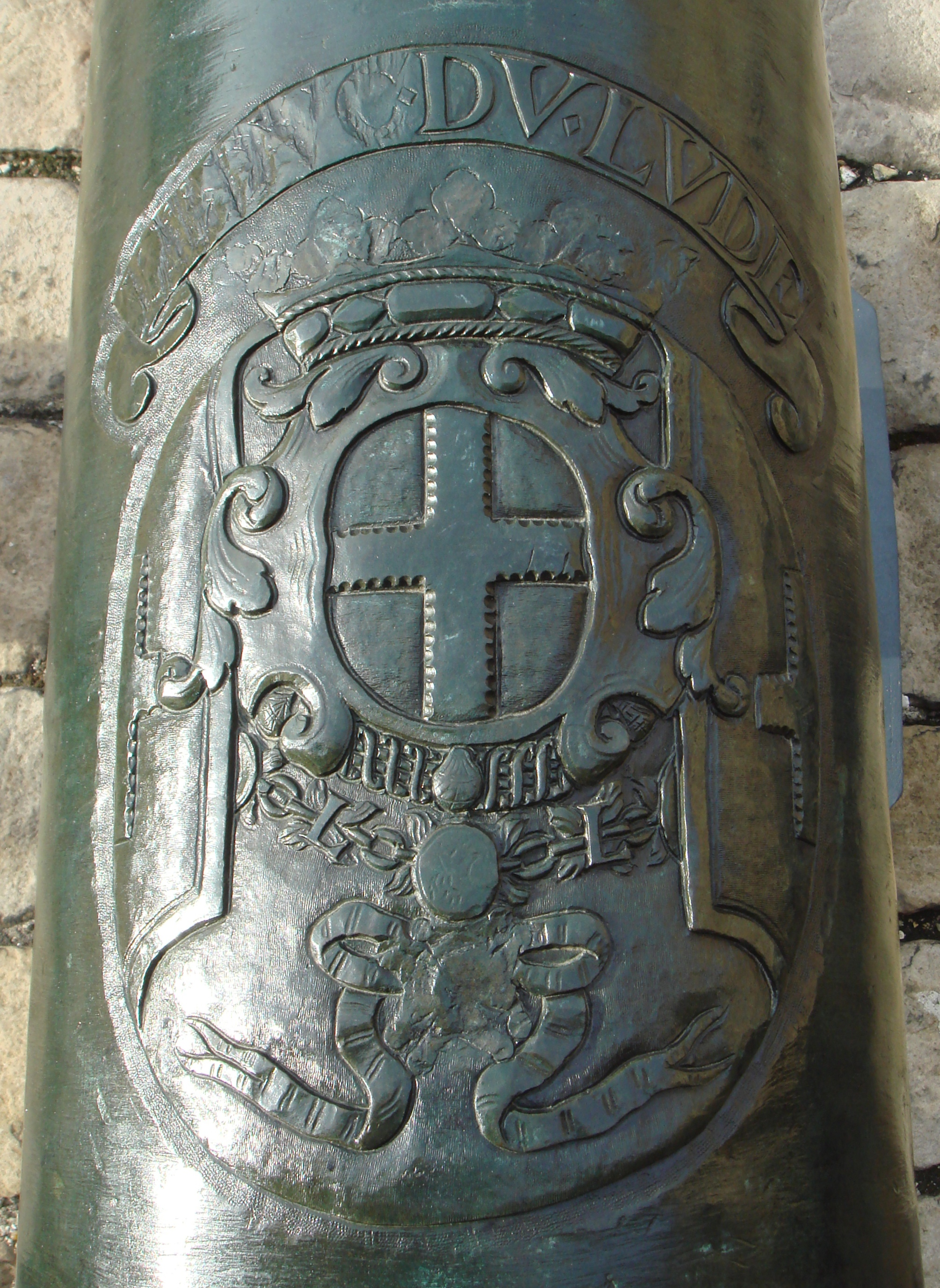
Emblem on Le Protecteur.

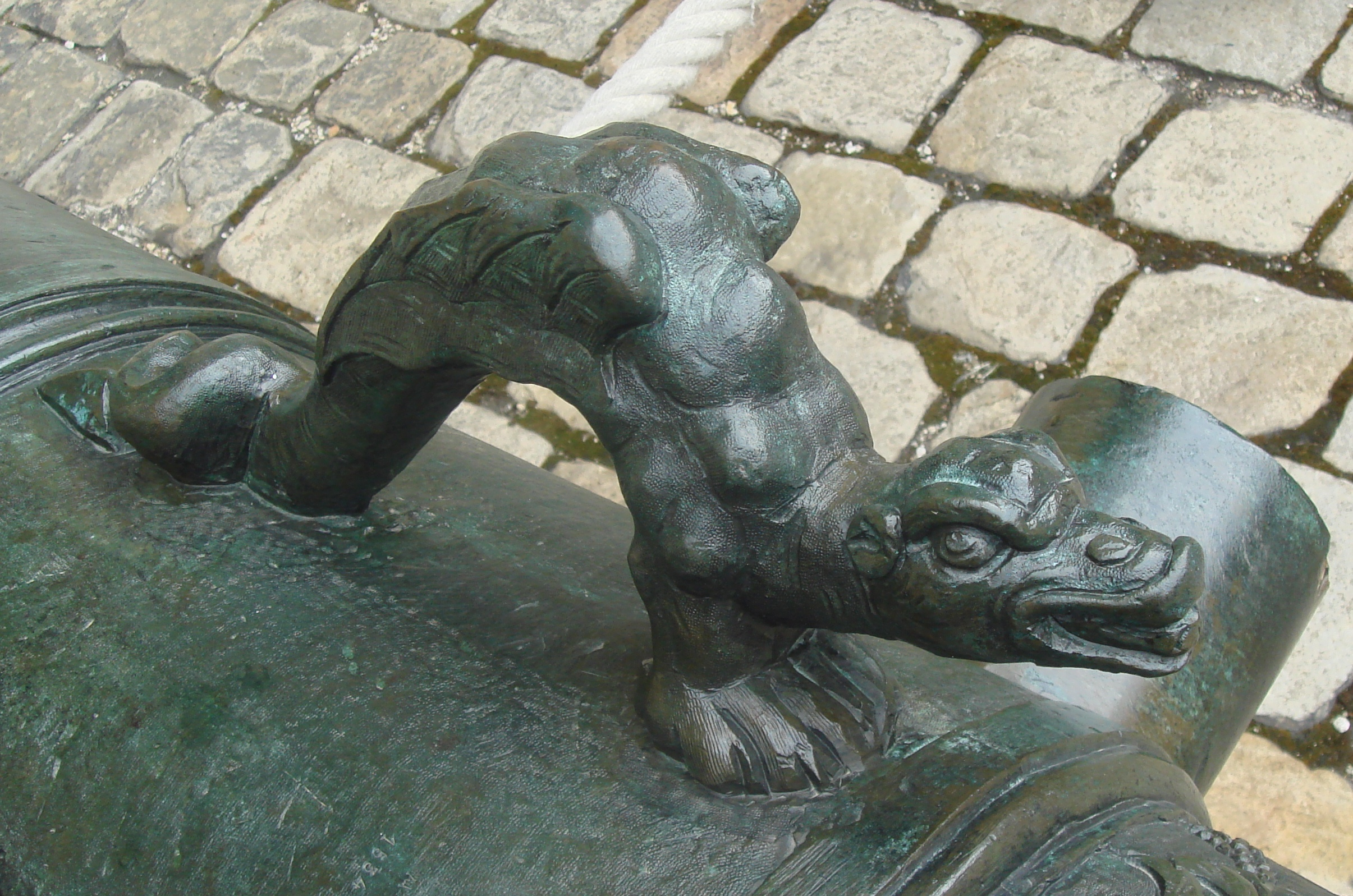
Dragon handle on Le Protecteur.

Jean-Jacques Keller (1635–1700) and his brother Jean-Balthazar Keller (1638–1702) were Swiss gunfounders from Zürich, in the service of France.

Jean-Jacques was considered one of the most skillful founders of France. In 1669, he became "Master of the foundries" (Commissaire des Fontes) at Douai. He also established other foundries in Besançon, Breisach and Pinerolo. His work was integral part of the plan established by Louvois in 1666 to have the army and artillery reorganized.

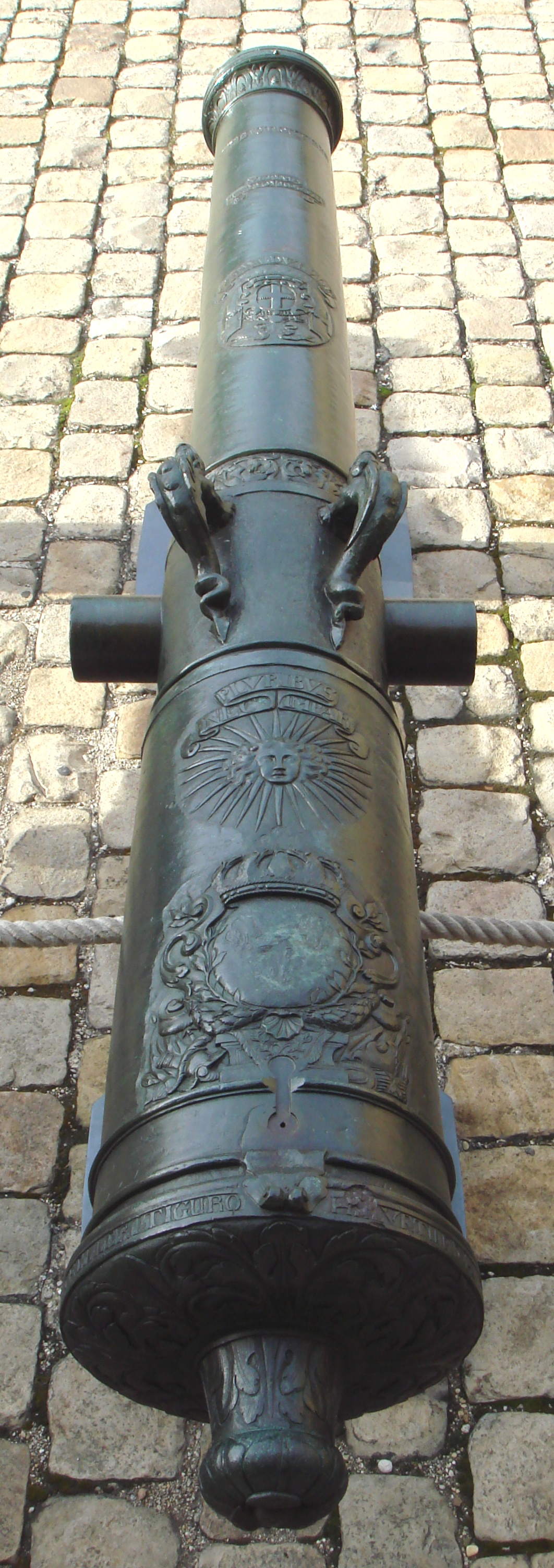
Jean-Jacques Keller Canon de 24 (24-pounder cannon), Le Protecteur, founded in 1683. Caliber: 151 mm (5.9 in). Length: 320 mm (13 in). Weight: 2,271 kg (5,007 lb).

His brother Jean-Balthasar was rather involved with the founding of statues. He famously founded the statue of Louis XIV then located in the Place Vendôme, in December 1692, in a single piece, something never achieved before. The statue was destroyed during the French Revolution on 10 August 1792.

Jean-Jacques met with trouble when some of his guns burst in 1694. He was then replaced by his brother Jean-Balthasar as Commissaire des Fontes at Douai.

The two brothers had a great influence on cannon founding techniques in France, and made thousands of artillery pieces.

The technology they employed, involving the founding of cannons around a plaster core, was superseded by the De Vallière system in 1732.

== See also ==
Media related to Jean-Jacques Keller at Wikimedia Commons

== Gallery ==
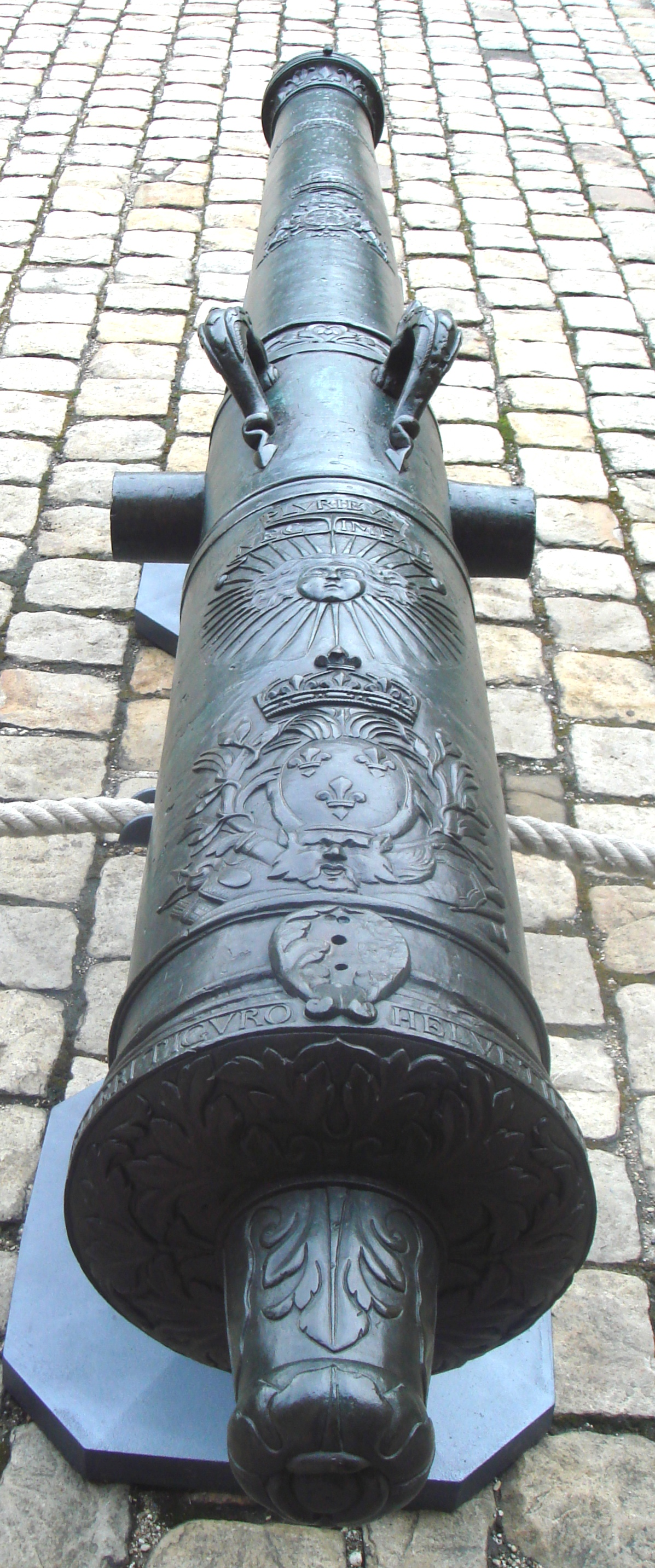
Keller 12-pounder Le Solide. Caliber: 121 mm. Length: 310 cm. Weight: 1,586 kg. 1688.

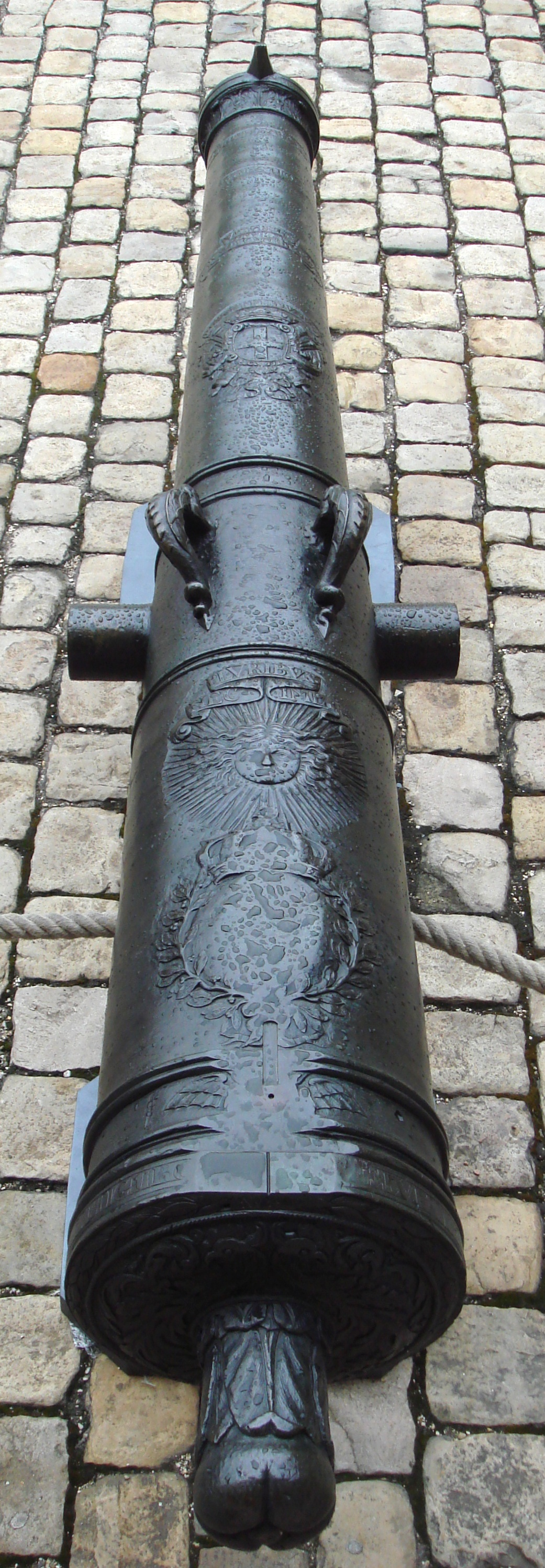
Keller 16-pounder Le Combattant. Caliber: 134 mm. Length: 310 cm. Weight: 2,369 kg. 1674

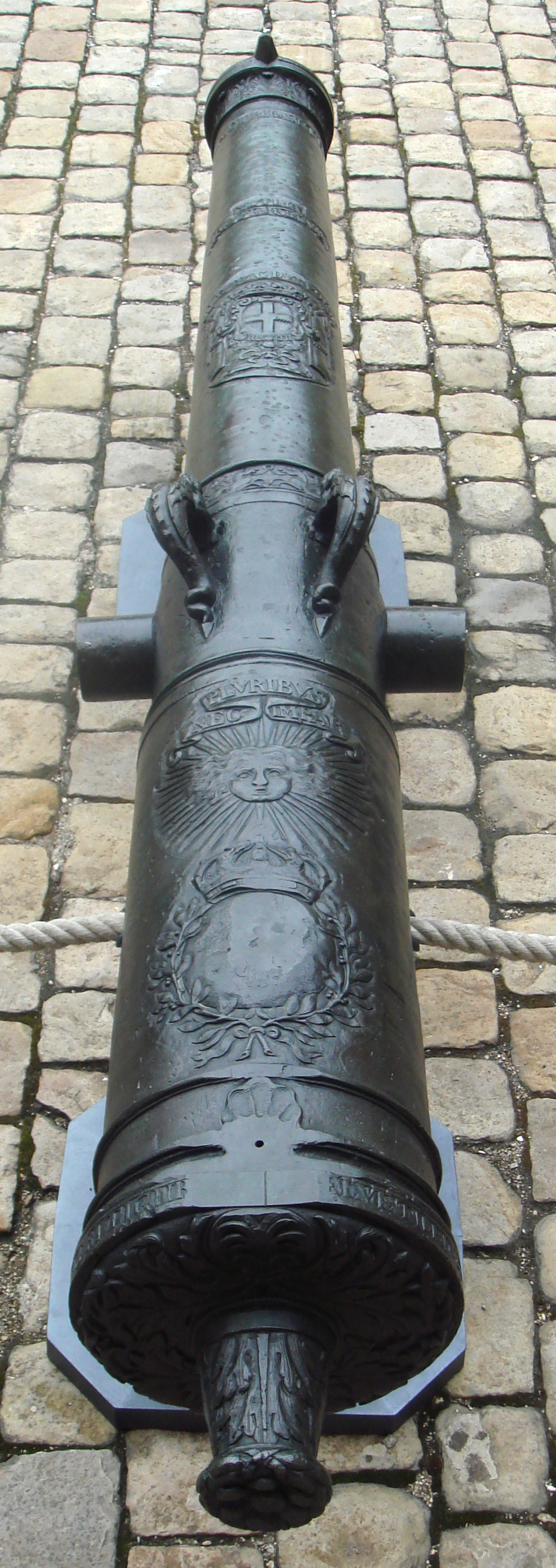
Keller 16-pounder La Curiosité. Caliber: 134 mm. Length: 310 cm. Weight: 1,968 kg. 1679
