= Swedish 4-pounder cannon =

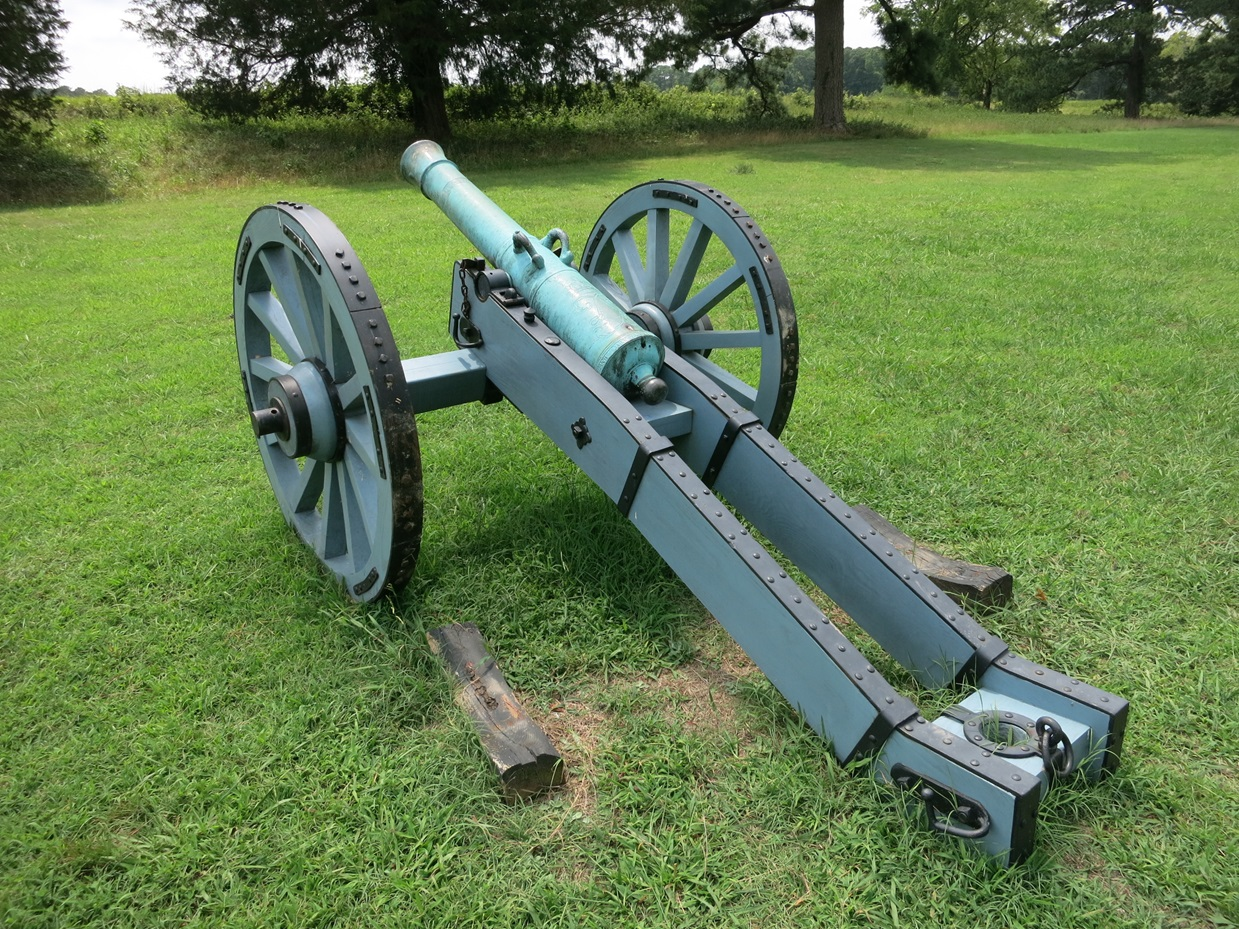
- Model 1773 Swedish 4-pounder gun Le Renard is located at the Colonial National Historical Park in Yorktown, Virginia. (Note: Summerfield showed a photo of the same cannon and called it a Model 1773 (Summerfield 2012b, p. 52).)
- Type: Artillery
- Place of origin: Sweden; Kingdom of France

Service history
- In service: Kingdom of France 1740–1781
- Used by: Kingdom of France
- Wars: War of the Austrian Succession; Seven Years' War; American Revolutionary War

Production history
- Designer: Carl Cronstedt (1725); Jean Bérenger (1758)
- Designed: Sweden 1725; Kingdom of France 1740, 1758, 1773

Specifications
- Mass: 325 kg (717 lb)
- Length: 146 cm (4.8 ft)
- Crew: 18
- Shell: Round shot
- Shell weight: 2 kg (4.4 lb)
- Caliber: 84 mm (3.31 in)
- Rate of fire: 2 / minute (sustained); 8–10/minute (theoretical)
- Effective firing range: 600 yd (549 m)
- Maximum firing range: 1,310 yd (1,198 m)

The Swedish 4-pounder cannon was a bronze smoothbore muzzleloading cannon originally designed by Carl Cronstedt for the Swedish Army in 1725. The Cronstedt design was copied by the French Royal Army in 1740 when it was found that the French Vallière system guns were too heavy for field artillery. The so-called 4-pounder à la Suédois was notably used during the War of the Austrian Succession, including at the Battle of Fontenoy in 1745. During the Seven Years' War, France cast more Swedish 4-pounders to replace battle losses. One or two of the cannons were assigned to each battalion for artillery support. The Swedish 4-pounder was used as late as the American Revolutionary War during the Siege of Yorktown.

In English language accounts, the 4-pounder French-made gun is variously referred to as the Swedish 4-pounder, Swedish gun, 4-pdr suedoise, or 4-pounder à la Suédoise.

== Swedish guns ==
In the 1650s, most European authorities conceded that Sweden and the Dutch Republic designed and produced the best artillery. Under King Gustavus Adolphus, the Swedes reduced the weight of their cannons, including the famous leather cannons. Later, the leather guns were replaced by Lennart Torstensson's cast iron 4-pounders which weighed only 500 lb (230 kg) and served as the original regimental artillery. The Swedes also created mathematical artillery tables. While the Dutch allowed their leadership in gunnery to lapse, the Swedish Army maintained its excellence in artillery well into the 1700s. The armies of King Charles XII of Sweden employed light-weight regimental guns during the Great Northern War. John Churchill, 1st Duke of Marlborough also attached two 3-pounder guns to his English and Dutch infantry battalions during the War of the Spanish Succession but the French Royal Army was slow to adopt this innovation.

== French adoption ==
In 1735, the Chevalier de Bellac, a Frenchman serving with the Swedish artillery, obtained the technical drawings for the Model 1725 artillery system designed by Carl Cronstedt. Bellac passed the information to the French ambassador to Sweden, the Comte Charles Louis de Biaudos de Castéja, who sent the plans and two scale models to Monsieur Boiteulx de Gormond, the secretary general of the artillery. In 1737, Bellac, then Lieutenant-Governor of Metz, conducted some tests of light cannons that made French artillery officers aware of the weapon's capabilities. In 1732, the French Vallière system had been introduced, which standardized all cannons to five calibers. The Vallière guns were intended to be used interchangeably as siege and field artillery but the guns proved to be too heavy for field artillery. The Canon de 4 de Vallière (Vallière 4-pounder gun) weighed 1,150 lb (520 kg) while the Swedish 4-pounder weighed only 600 lb (270 kg).

In 1738, Charles Louis Auguste Fouquet, Duke of Belle-Isle suggested using light 4-pounder guns to serve with the infantry. He put forward the idea of designing the new cannon on the plans obtained by Bellac. In 1739, the engineer Bernard Forest de Bélidor determined by experimentation that the weight of the gunpowder charge should be one-third the weight of the round shot. In the face of strong opposition by Jean-Florent de Vallière and his adherents, Belle-Isle convinced the Secretary of State in War François Victor Le Tonnelier de Breteuil to begin testing the Swedish 4-pounder at Lacroix-Saint-Ouen. Some of the tests were witnessed by King Louis XV. The new gun was found to have a maximum rate of fire almost twice the Vallière 4-pounder's five shots per minute. This speed was achieved by using a canvas gunpowder cartridge and a powder-filled vent primer.

== Specifications ==
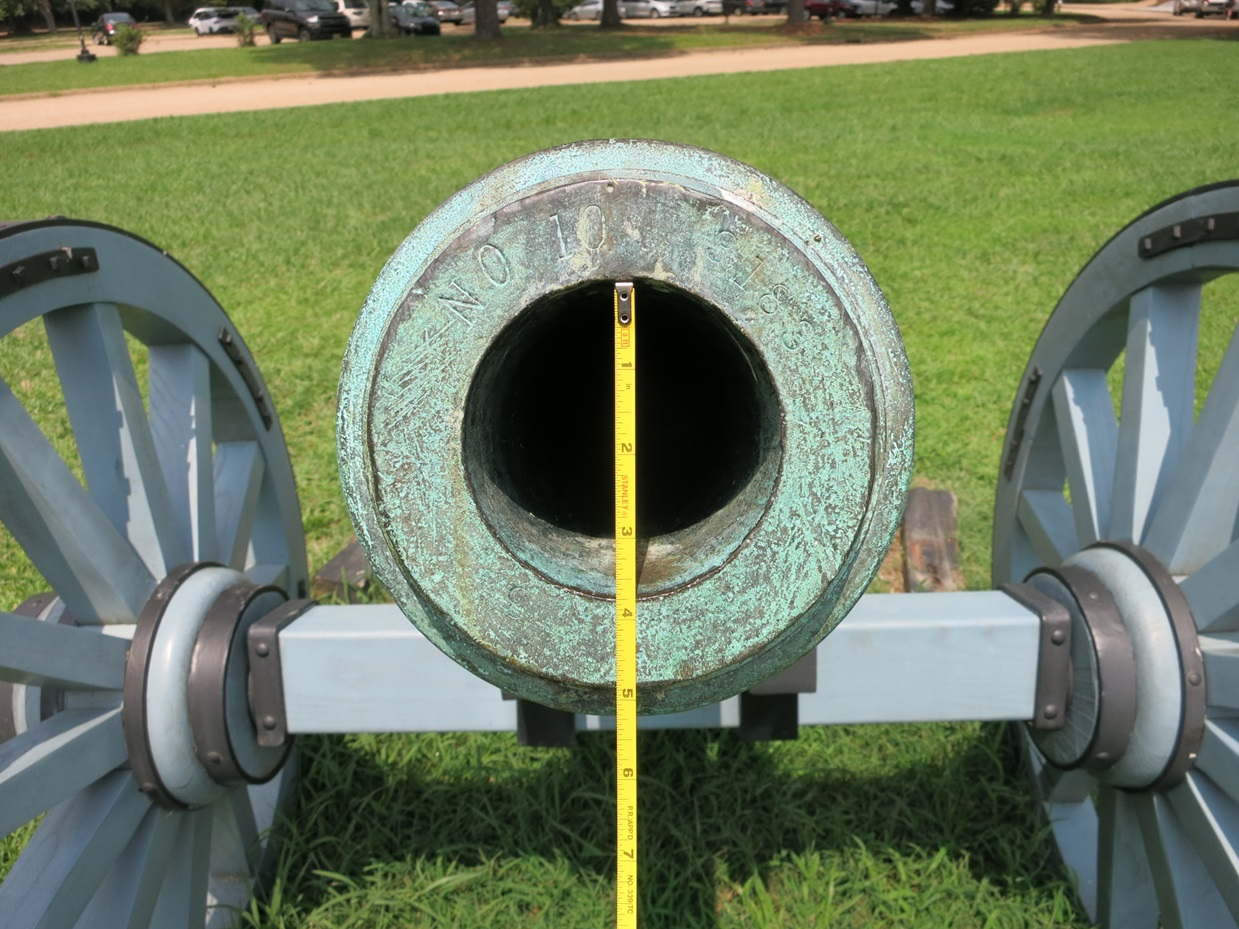
Model 1773 Swedish 4-pounder cannon has been re-bored from 84 mm (3.31 in) to 96 mm (3.78 in) to take 6-pounder shot.

In 1740, the Paris arsenal produced two prototype guns and placed them on a Swedish-type carriage. Tests showed that the cannons performed satisfactorily. Louis XV insisted that 50 Model 1740 Swedish 4-pounders were to be manufactured. The Model 1740 rested on a Brocard carriage which had a cheek length of 96 in (244 cm), wheel diameter of 57 in (146 cm), track width of 49 in (124 cm), total axle width of 65 in (164 cm), and transverse distance between wheels of 52 in (132 cm). The carriage had a vertical elevating screw and the gun loader was provided with a crooked rammer. The Model 1740 cannon was 17.4 calibers long and the carriage was moved using a Model 1732 Vallière limber. The gun was sometimes referred to as the Brocard 4-pounder.

The Swedish 4-pounder was not officially adopted by the French Royal Army until 1757. The Model 1773 gun barrel had a length of 57 in (146 cm), a weight of 717 lb (325 kg), and a caliber of 3.3 in (84 mm). The cannon was 16.5 calibers long. Including carriage and limber, total weight was 1,610 lb (730 kg). (Note: Summerfield only listed data for the Model 1773 Swedish 4-pounder - 16.5 calibers long, not Models 1740 or 1758 - 17.4 calibers long (Summerfield 2012b, p. 53).) A French 4-pounder fired a round shot that weighed 4.4 lb (2 kg). (Note: A French pound (livre) was equal to 489.41 g (1.079 lb) while an English pound was equal to 453.6 g (Chartrand & Hutchins 2003, p. 2).) The sustained rate of fire of a 4-pounder cannon was two rounds per minute. It was theoretically possible for the Swedish 4-pounder to fire 8 to 10 shots per minute. The gun could take a gunpowder charge of 1.25 to 2.0 lb (0.57 to 0.91 kg). The maximum range of the Swedish 4-pounder was 1,310 yd (1,200 m) when fired at an elevation of 3.67°. Its effective range was 600 yd (550 m).

== History ==
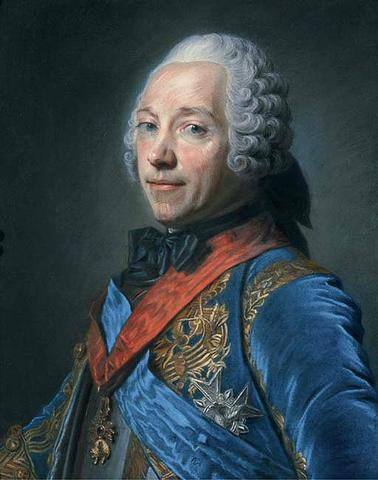
Charles, Duke of Belle-Isle

During the War of the Austrian Succession, the Swedish 4-pounder cannons were relegated to the artillery park and employed at the discretion of the army commander. In 1741, a French army crossed the Rhine and marched through the Black Forest. Because the poor roads badly slowed the progress of the extra heavy Vallière 24-pounders, Marshal Belle-Isle directed that the 24-pounders be left at Ingolstadt. This decision meant that the Swedish 4-pounders were the French army's only artillery when it appeared before Prague. Luckily, the French and their Saxon allies captured Prague in a coup de main on the night of 25 November 1741. The French army was trapped in Prague in December 1742 and expected to surrender. Instead, Belle-Isle led 11,000 infantry, 3,000 cavalry, and 30 light artillery pieces in a remarkable mid-winter escape. Estimated fatalities were 1,500, mostly caused by the weather.

Marshal Maurice de Saxe became such a supporter of the Swedish 4-pounder that the May 1744 Flanders Artillery Park included 40 Vallière 4-pounders and 10 Swedish 4-pounders. In 1745, the Flanders artillery train counted 50 Swedish 4-pounders with 200 rounds per gun and only 36 Vallière 4-pounders with 150 rounds per gun. The Swedish gun was sometimes called the De Saxe 4-pounder.

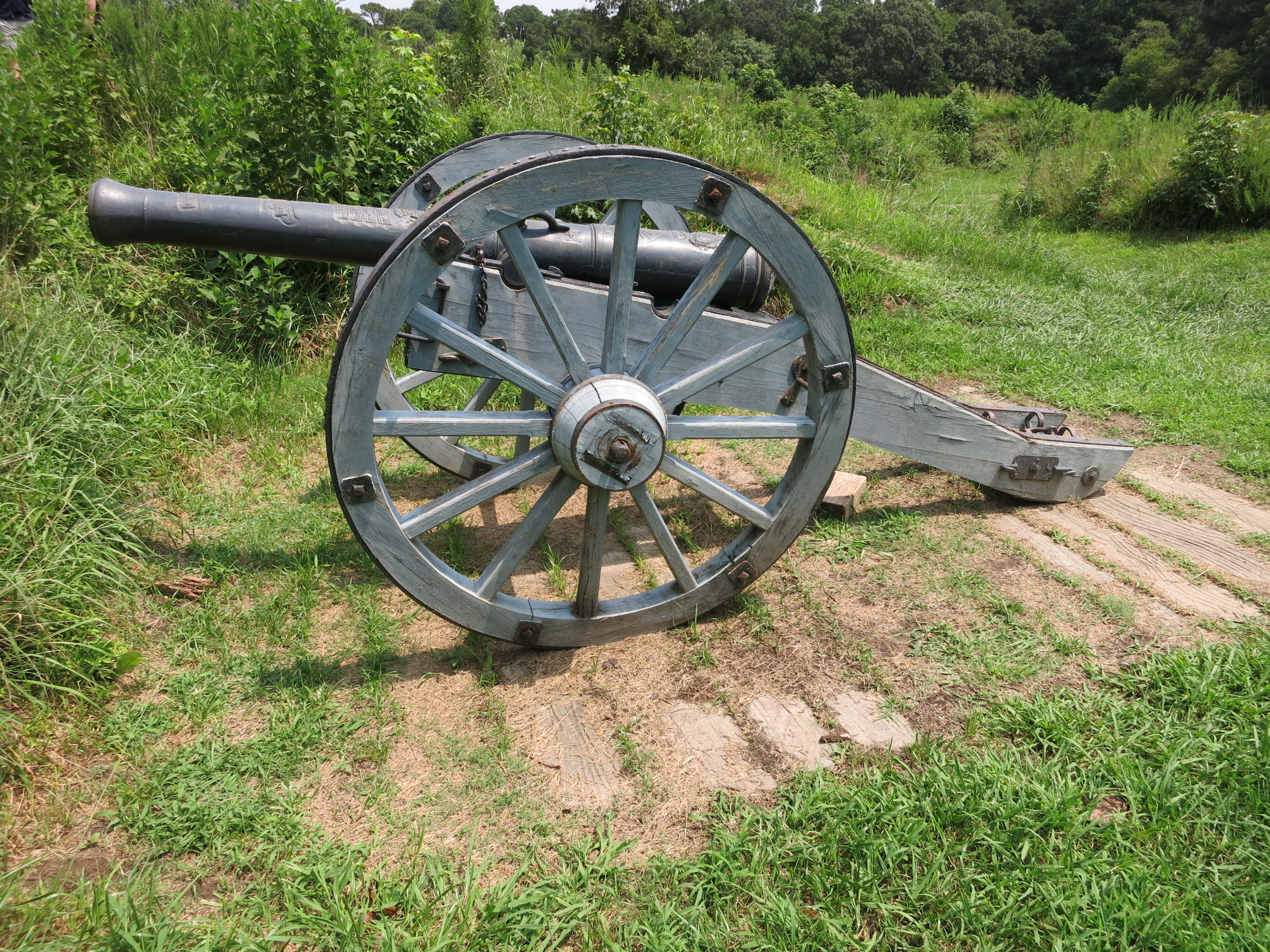
4-pounder Vallière cannon La Souris is located at Colonial National Historical Park in Yorktown, Virginia. Note the long barrel.

At the Battle of Fontenoy on 11 May 1745, an Allied army under Prince William, Duke of Cumberland attacked a French army led by Maurice de Saxe. The French defeated two Dutch assaults on their right flank, then the British and Hanoverian infantry began ponderously advancing on the French center. Because French fortifications on both flanks were unsubdued, the ends of the Allied lines folded back so that the formation took on the shape of a massive square. As the British-Hanoverian square crashed through the French infantry, Saxe ordered cavalry charges against the square which cost the lives of many horsemen but finally halted its progress. Saxe deployed the French artillery with care. At 10:00 am, four Swedish 4-pounders blasted the right-front corner of the square with seven salvoes, reducing it to a shambles. This attracted the fire of the Allied cannon but other French guns were able to concentrate on the square. Saxe hurled every available unit against the square, but what finally defeated it was a charge by the elite Maison du Roi cavalry. The bloodbath cost each side 7,000–7,500 casualties, including 2,500 dead.

The performance of the Swedish 4-pounders at Fontenoy was regarded as disappointing, so their numbers were reduced. The Flanders artillery train of 1748 included 80 Vallière 4-pounders and only 10 Swedish 4-pounders. While the Vallière 4-pounders required four horses, the Swedish guns only needed two horses. At the conclusion of the war in 1748, the Swedish 4-pounders were withdrawn from service.

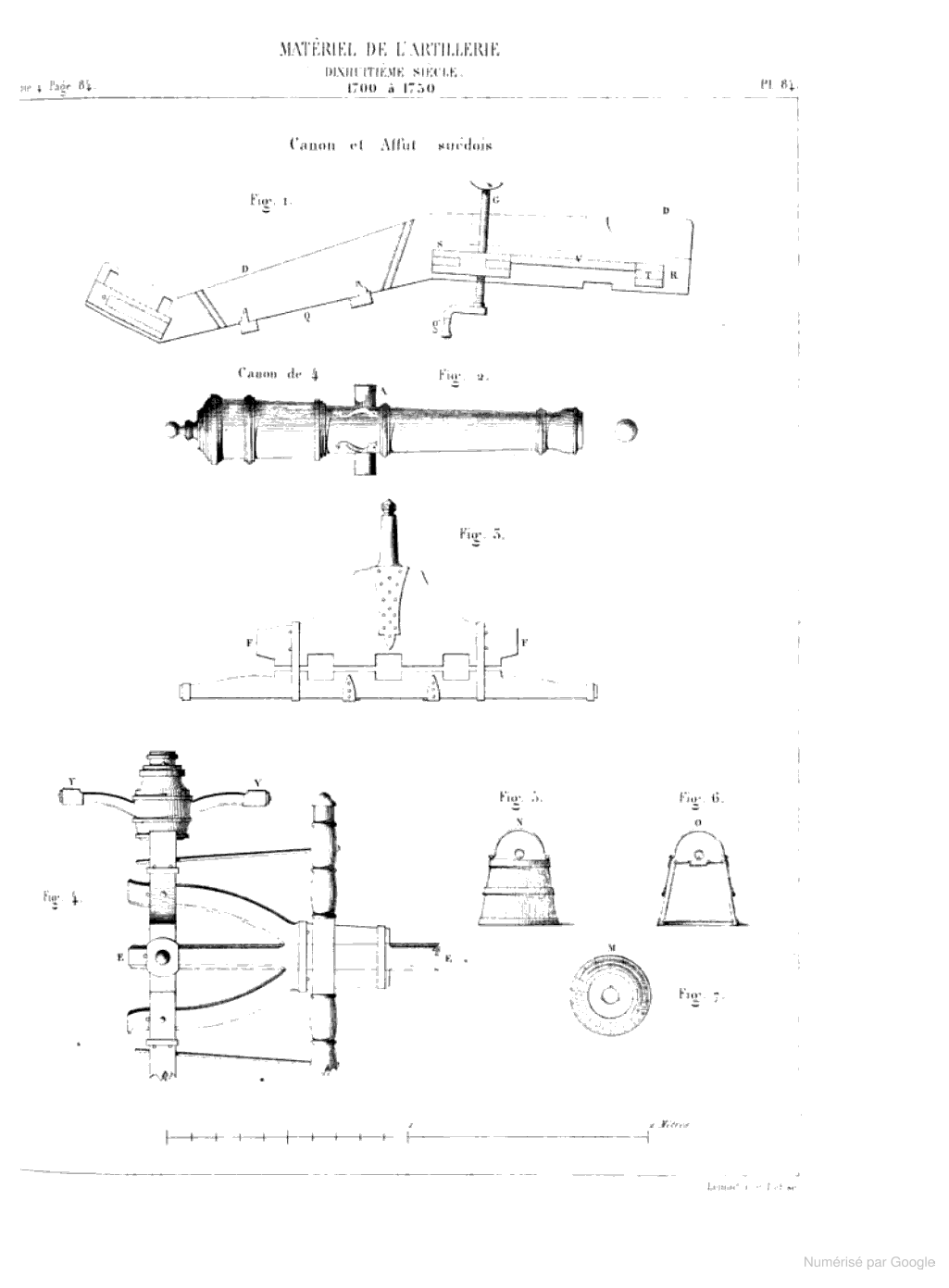
Diagram: Canon et Affût suédois (Cannon and Carriage Swedish)

At the start of the Seven Years' War, the French Royal Army found itself at a disadvantage against the lighter British and Prussian field artillery. On 20 January 1757, King Louis XV authorized one Swedish 4-pounder to be allocated to each infantry battalion with a crew of two sergeants, eight gunners, and eight assistant-gunners. The king allocated 1,200 French livres to purchase three horses and equipment. Many of the Swedish 4-pounders were lost at the Battle of Rossbach on 5 November 1757. Marshal Belle-Isle, now Secretary of War, ordered 100 new Model 1758 Swedish 4-pounders with the Model 1740 Brocard carriage and the Model 1732 Vallière limber. The Model 1758 guns were designed by Jean François Bérenger and were 17.4 calibers long. On 4 January 1759, Belle-Isle ordered two Swedish 4-pounders to be assigned to each infantry battalion. At the conclusion of the war on 20 December 1762, the Swedish 4-pounders were withdrawn to the arsenals.

The Gribeauval system replaced the Vallière system on 17 August 1765. Vallière's son Joseph-Florent Vallière was appointed Director-General of Artillery and he reinstated the Vallière system on 23 August 1772. The Swedish 4-pounders were reassigned to the infantry battalions in 1773. Also, a new Model 1773 was designed and cast with fewer decorations on the gun barrel. These cannons were 16.5 calibers long and had a 165:1 weight ratio. On 3 October 1774, a royal order brought back the Gribeauval system. The Swedish 4-pounders were employed during the Siege of Yorktown in October 1781 during the American Revolutionary War. The regiments serving under Claude-Anne de Rouvroy de Saint Simon were armed with eight Swedish 4-pounder cannons. The guns were not withdrawn to the arsenals until the 1790s when they were re-bored to accommodate 6-pounder shot.

== Gallery ==
Swedish 4-pounder cannon at Colonial National Historical Park in Yorktown, Virginia
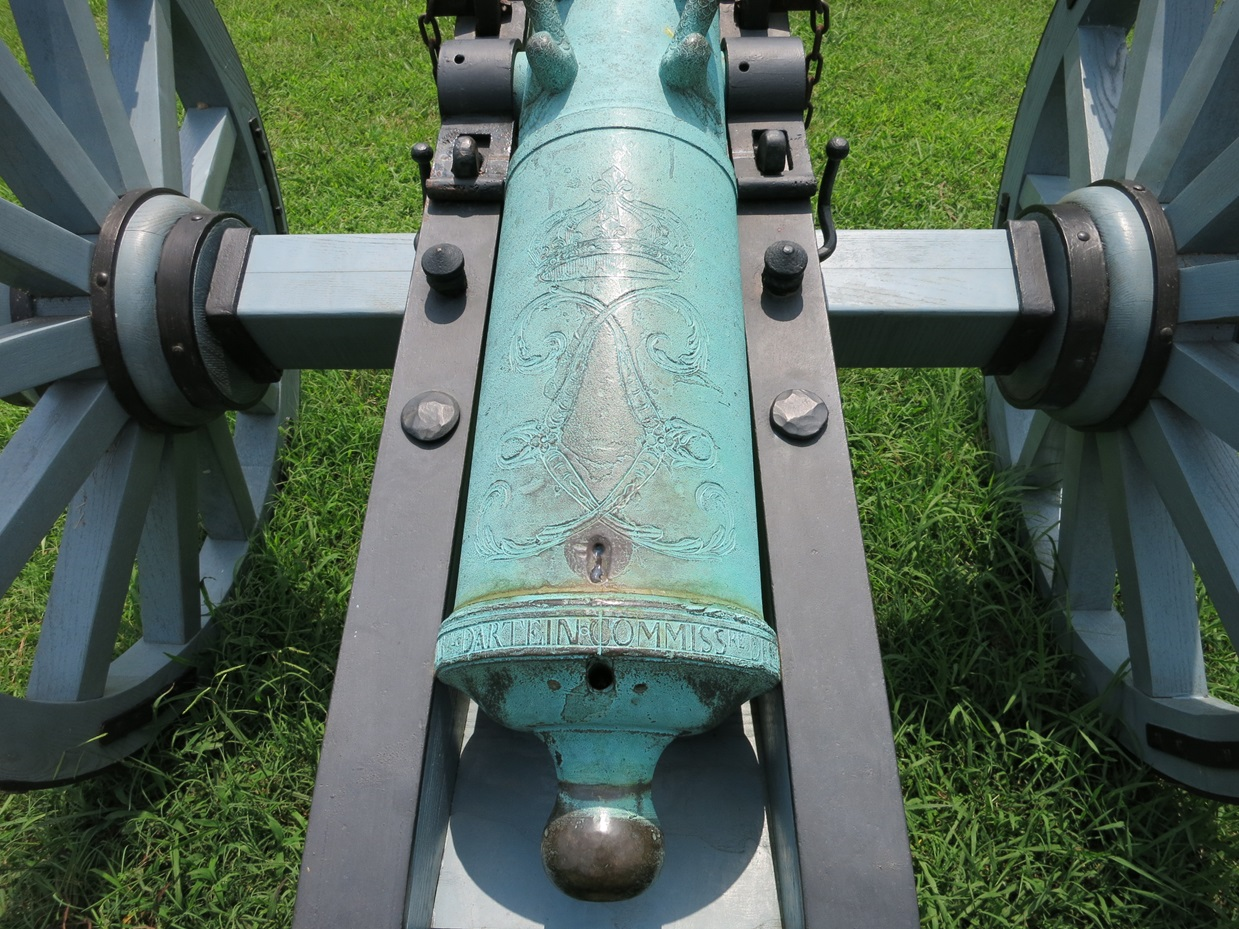
Breech: Royal inscription

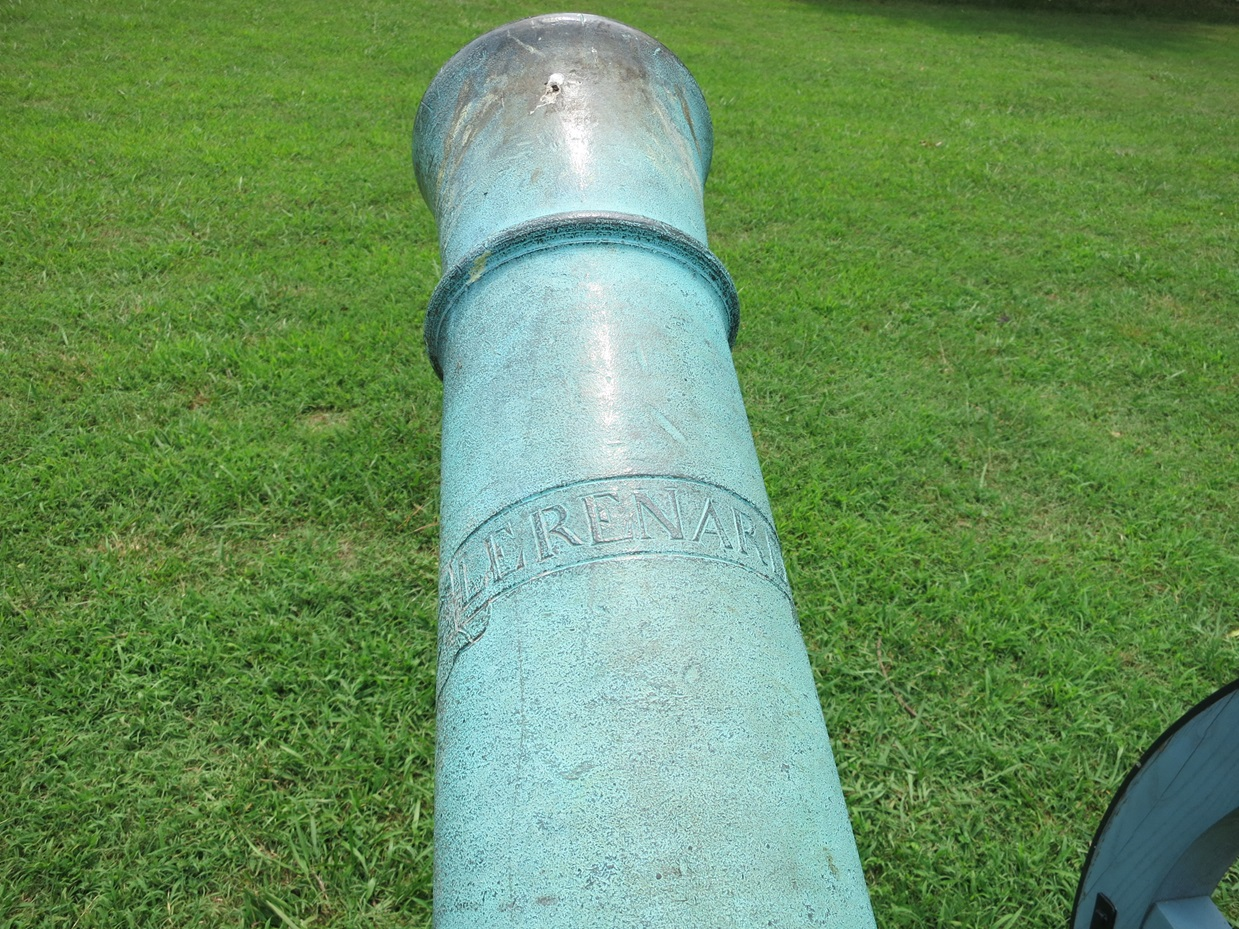
Le Renard (The Fox)

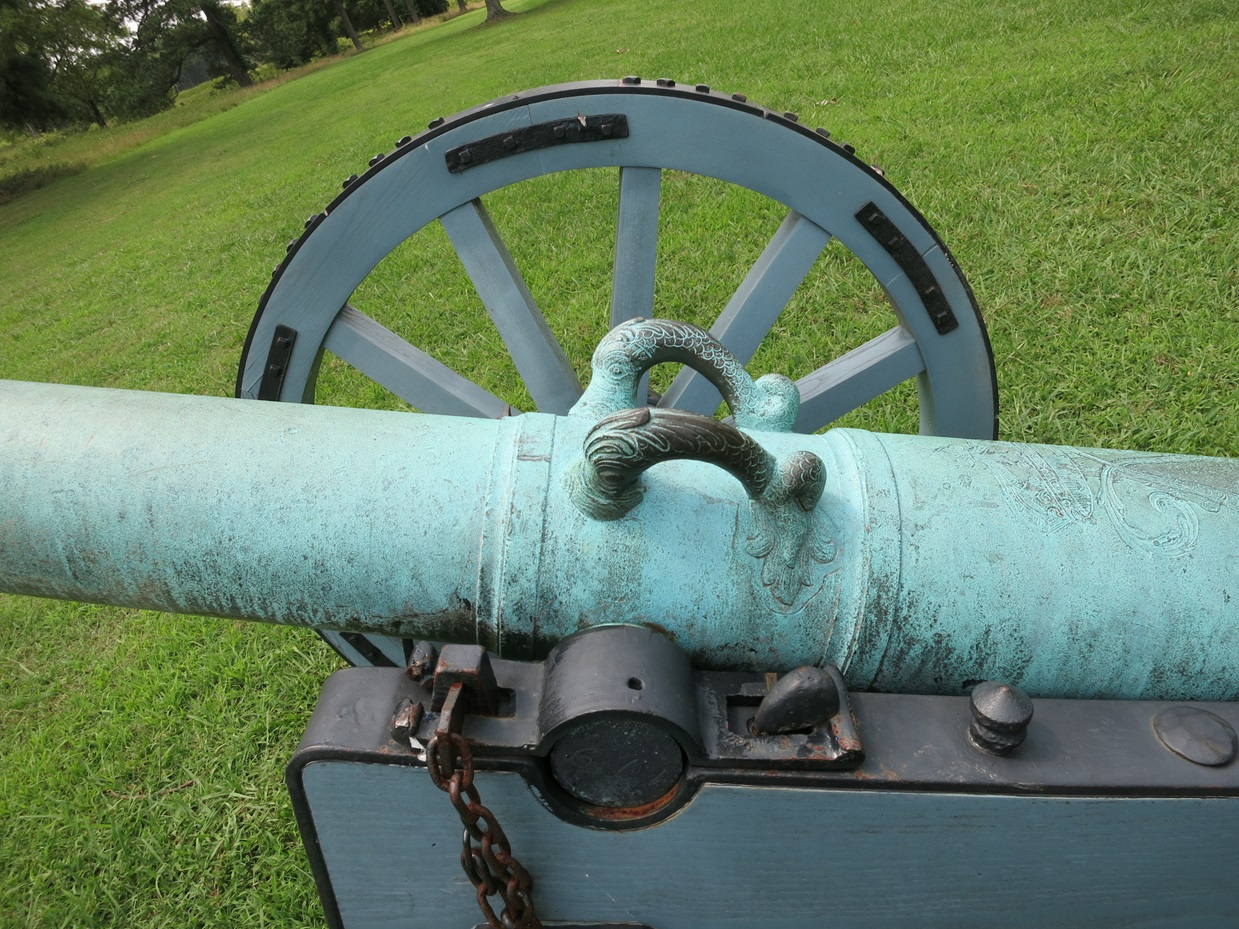
Dolphins and trunnions

== Notes ==
Footnotes

Citations
